= Malstatt-Burbach =

Previous industrial town in Prussia

Coordinates: 49°14′39″N 6°57′4″E

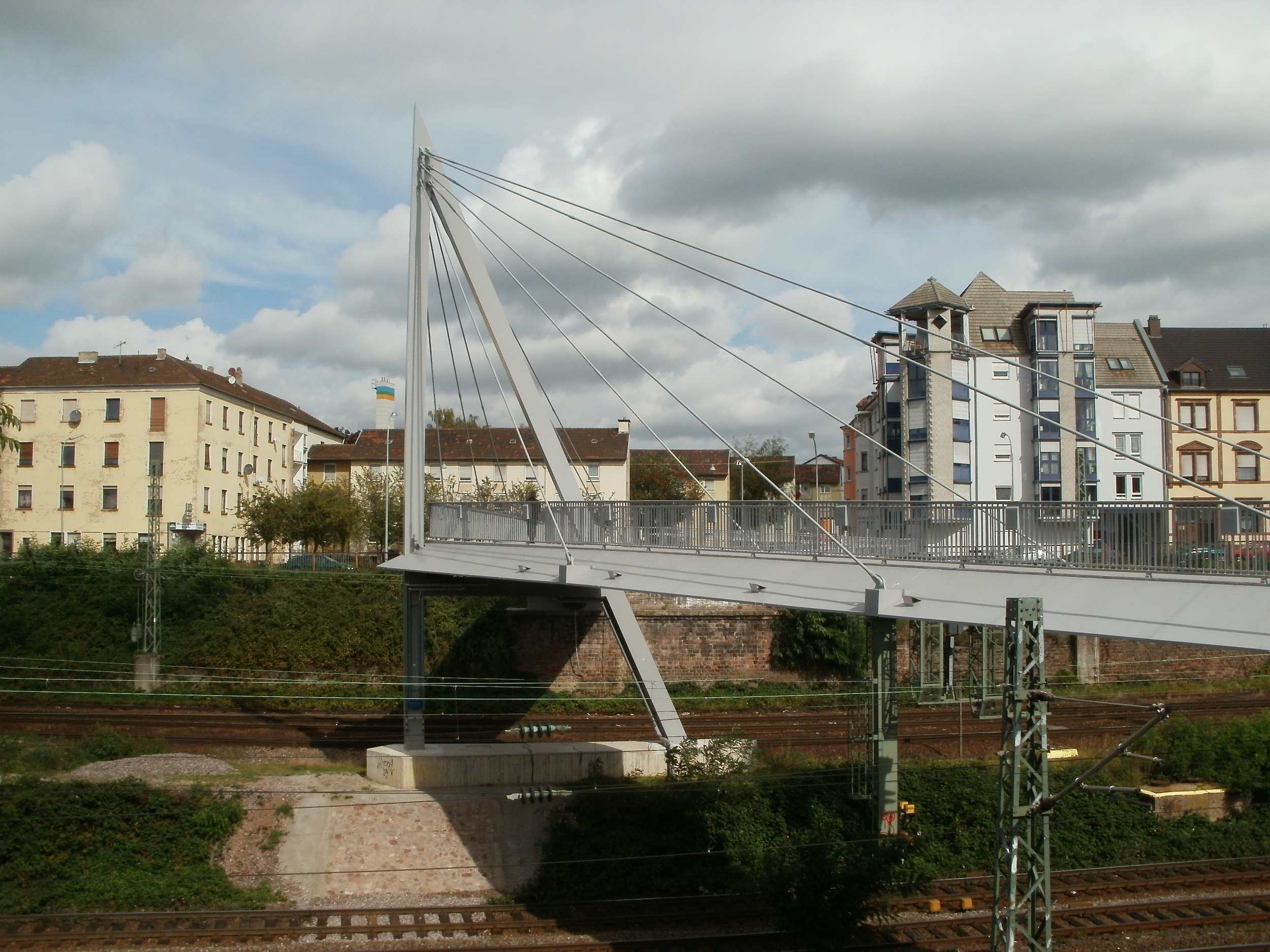
Malstatt-Burbach

Malstatt-Burbach was a Prussian industrial town, later incoporated into Saarbrücken.

Malstatt received municipal rights in 1321. These, however, were afterwards resigned to the newer town of Saarbrücken, and in 1818 Malstatt and Burbach were two small villages with a joint population of only about 800. About the middle of the century the population began to increase rapidly, in consequence of the development of the mining industry of the district and the extension of the railway system, and in 1874 the two villages were united to form a town.

In 1900, Malstatt-Burbach had a population of 31,195. At the time, it belonged to the district of Saarbrücken, the southernmost district of Prussia's Rhine Province. It joined the former Saarbrücken (now called Alt-Saarbrücken) and Sankt Johann to form the present city of Saarbrücken in 1909.

Malstatt-Burbach was an industrial town, described by the 1911 Encyclopædia Britannica as "little more than a long and narrow row of manufactories and workmen's houses". The largest factories were engaged in the production of iron, steel and cement. There was a large wharf on the river for the export of coal.

The Burbach ironworks, which had employed more than 23,000 people in 1975, was closed in 1988, temporarily causing an unemployment rate of 23%.
