= Höhere Berufsfachschule für Wirtschaftsinformatik =

School in Germany

Coordinates: 49.2068°N 7.0464°E

The Höhere Berufsfachschule für Wirtschaftsinformatik (HBFS-WI) located in Saarbrücken, Germany is a school providing higher vocational education in information technology and economics awarding the designation "Staatlich geprüfte(r) Wirtschaftsinformatiker(in)" (English: "state-examined business informatics/software engineer"). According to the German Qualifications Framework, the designation is at the same level to a university-level bachelor's degree.

== Entry requirements ==
As entry requirements matriculation standard or advanced technical college entrance qualification are demanded.

== Characteristics of education ==
=== Episodes and duration ===
The degree is divided into a year of lower grade followed by a year of upper grade. In between the two grades students are required to complete a mandatory internship in the fields of business information systems of a minimum of eight weeks.

=== Education contents ===
The education covers both economics and information technology.

The HBFS-WI teaches the following subjects in the lower grade year: Programming in the computer languages C# and Visual Basic .NET in the technical environment of the .NET-Framework as well as methods of programming and algorithms. In the subject area of system integration students deal with the operating systems Microsoft Windows XP-Professional, Windows Server 2003, Linux, and hardware technologies. The subject software development uses tools of process modelling such as ARIS and tools of project management such as MS Project. The design and appliance of databases are taught using Microsoft database MS Access whereas the SQL language is taught as well. In the lower grade term the subject software application provides professional knowledge of the office programs Excel and Microsoft Word. In this context VBA (Visual Basic for Applications) is taught as well. Furthermore, students practice presentation skills using PowerPoint. Web design and HTML are further parts of this subject.

The subject area of economics deals with business administration, national economics, law and mathematics.

In the upper grade students choose to focus either in system integration or programming. While the system integration focus provides deeper knowledge of operating systems and network technologies, students choosing programming continue their education in the programming subjects. Students are provided professional learning materials by the cooperation with the Cisco Networking Academy and the Microsoft Academic Alliance enabling students to absolve special Cisco Systems Certifications.

== Location ==
The HBFS-WI is a specialized technology school located in Saarbrücken, in the center of the European Union (EU), neighboring France (10 km) and Luxembourg (50 km).
