= Saarbrücken =

Capital of Saarland, Germany

Saarbrücken Saarbrigge (Rhenish Franconian) Sarrebruck (French)
- City
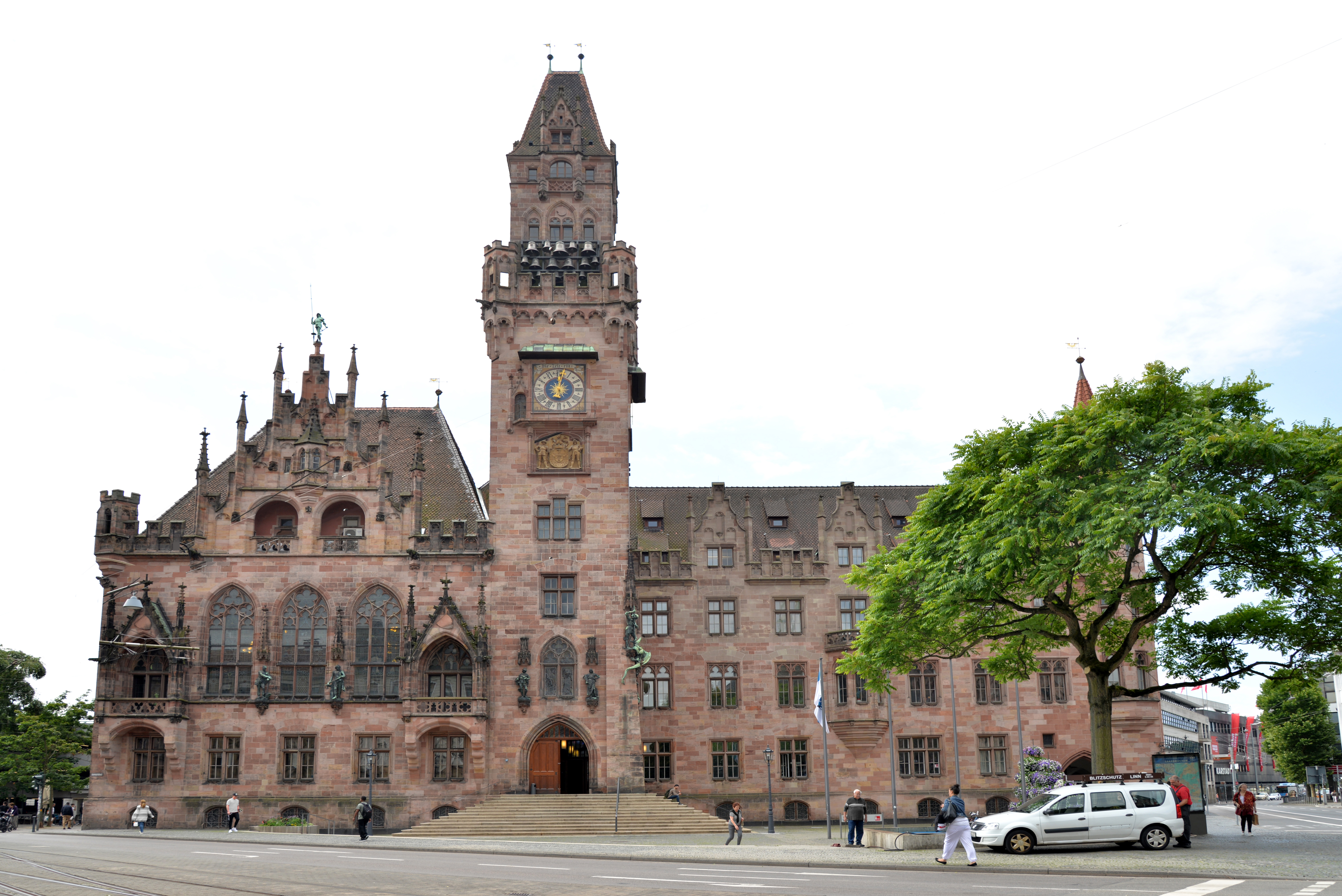
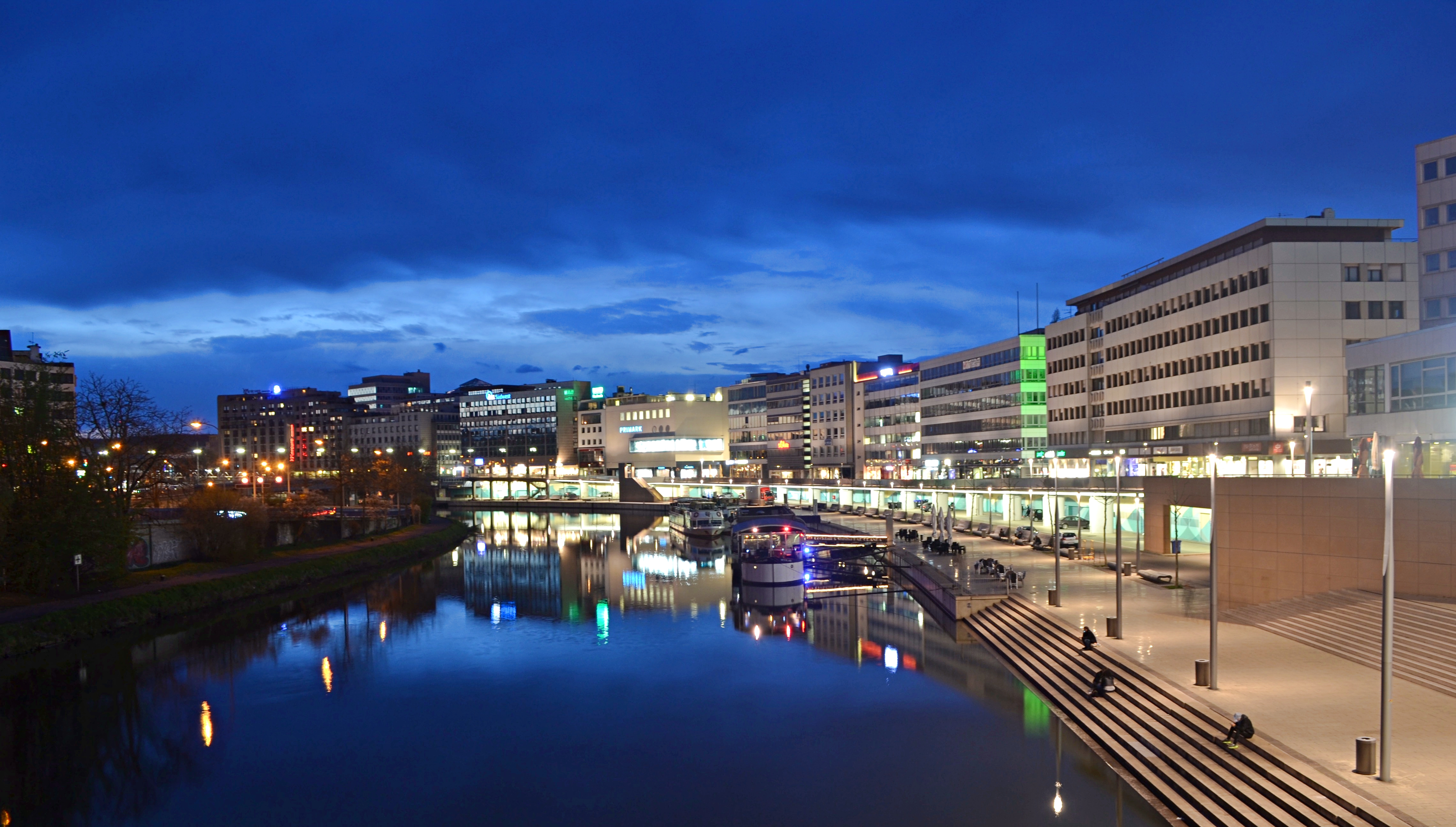
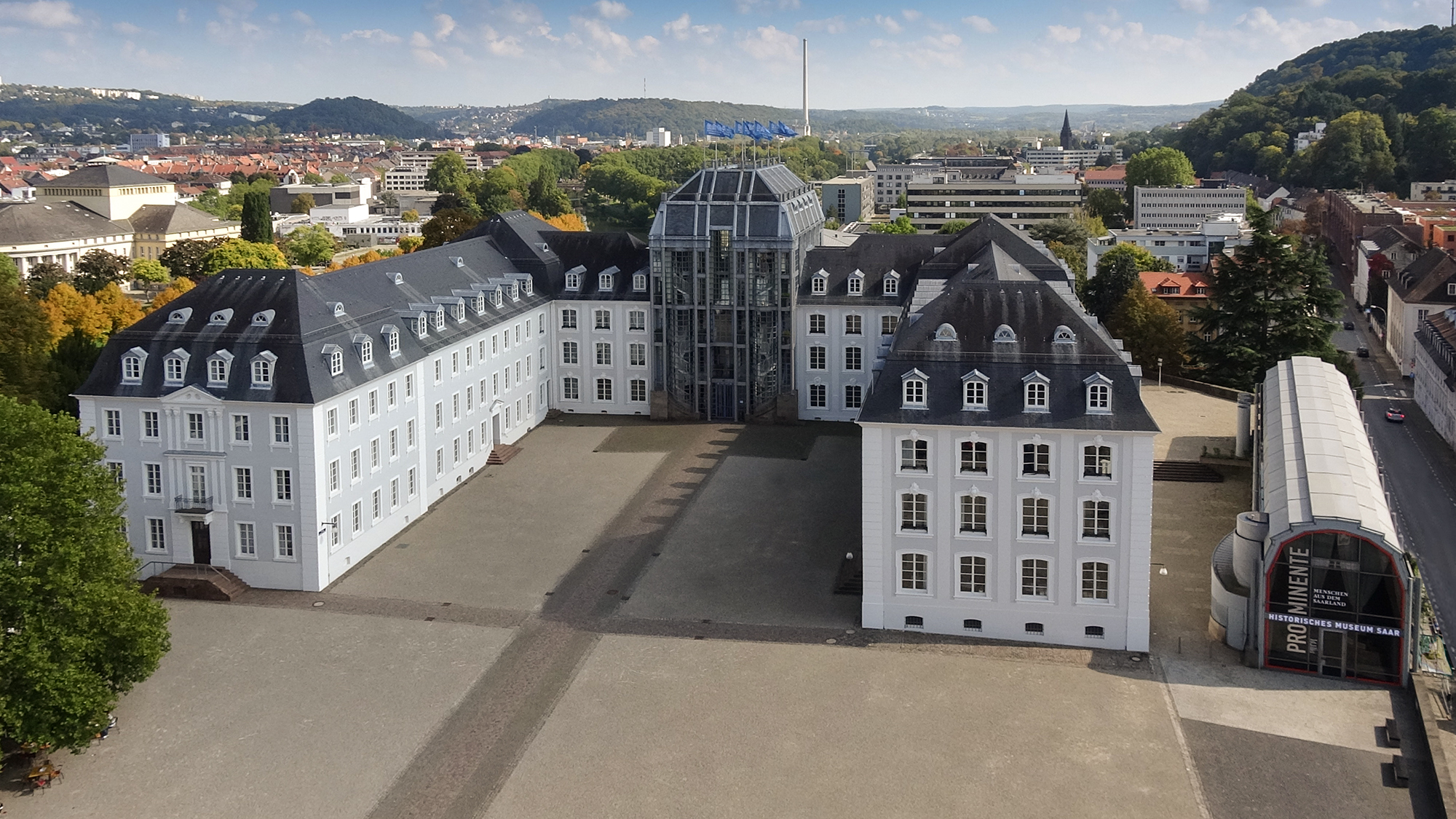
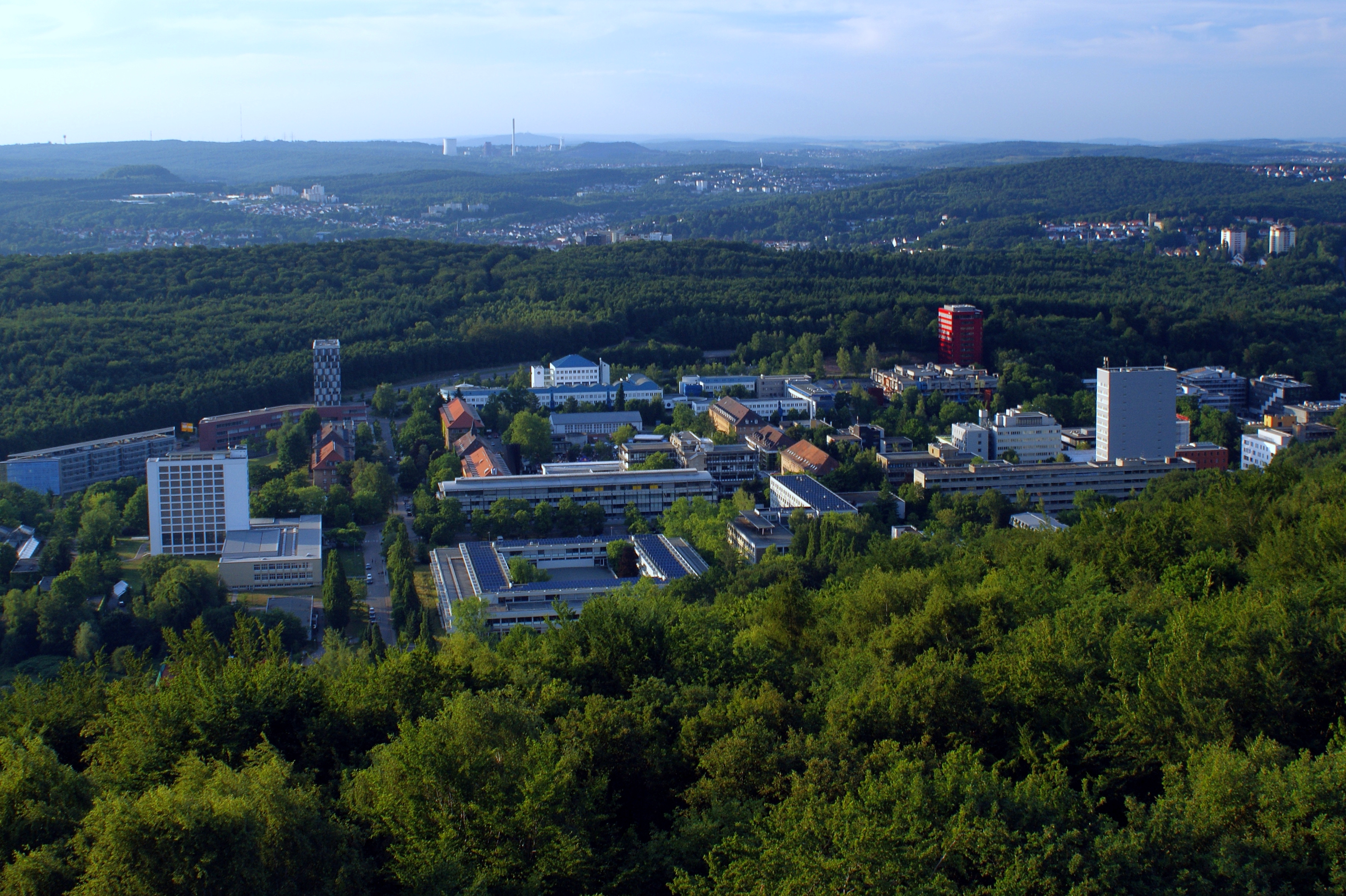
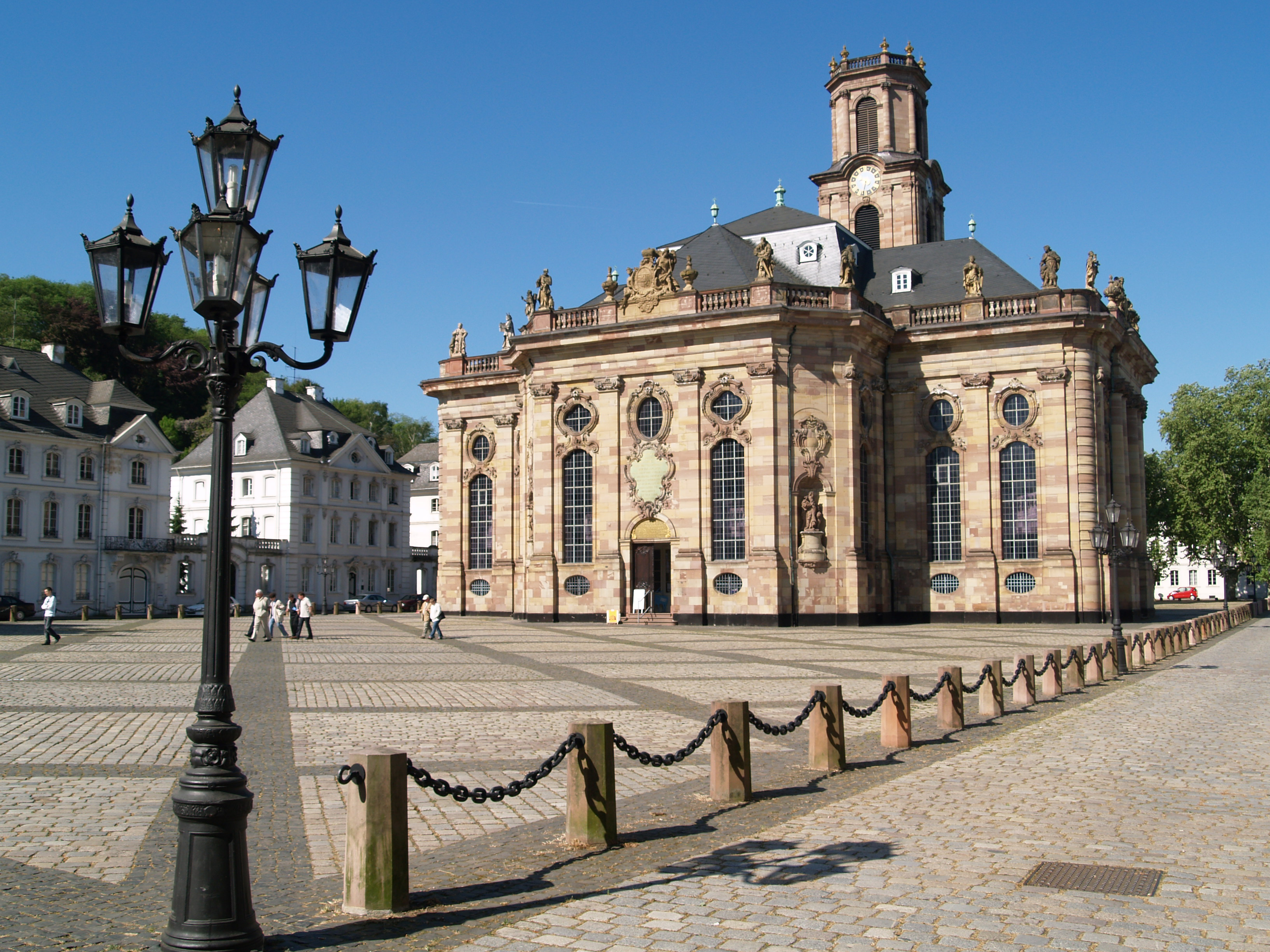
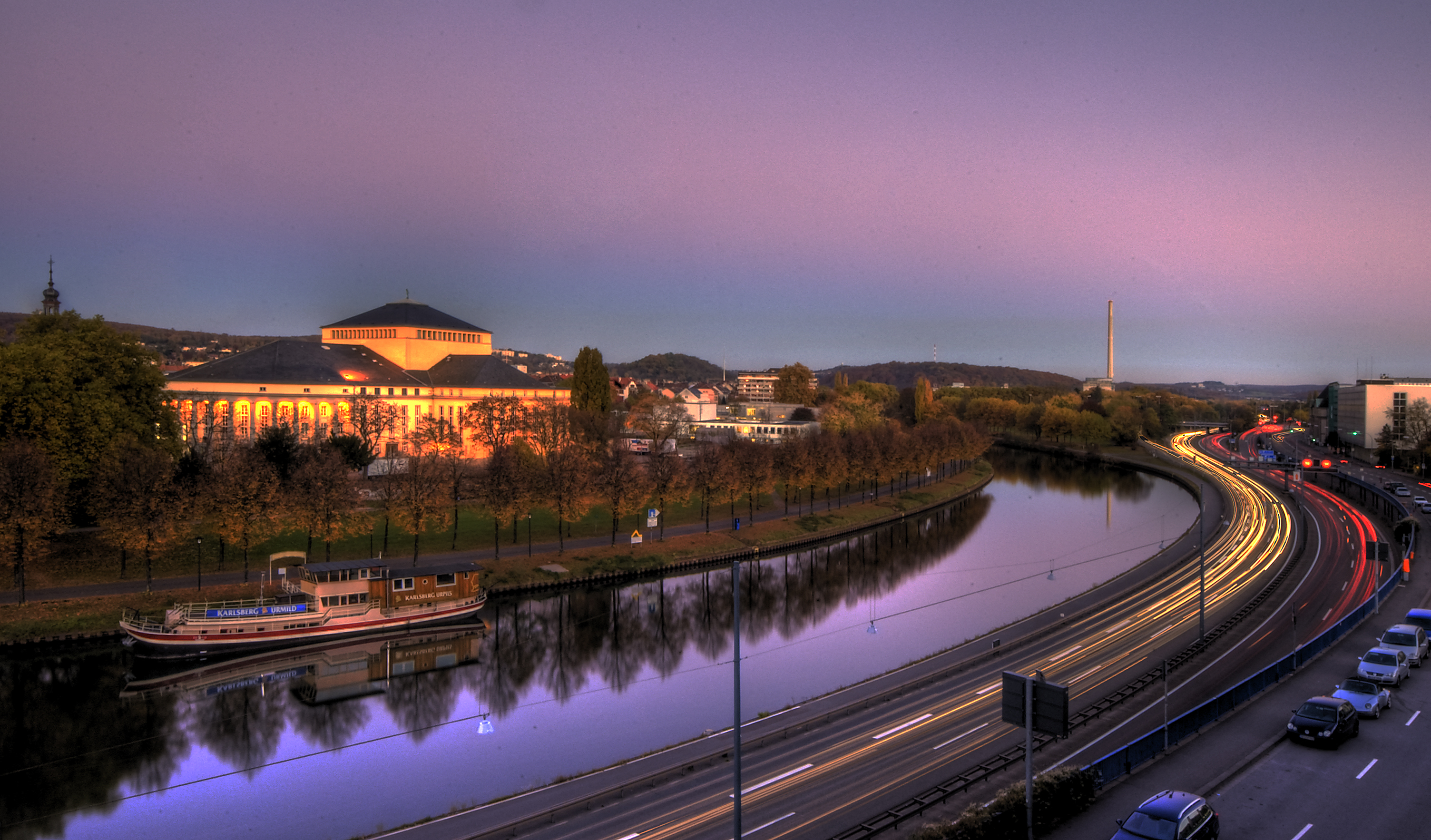
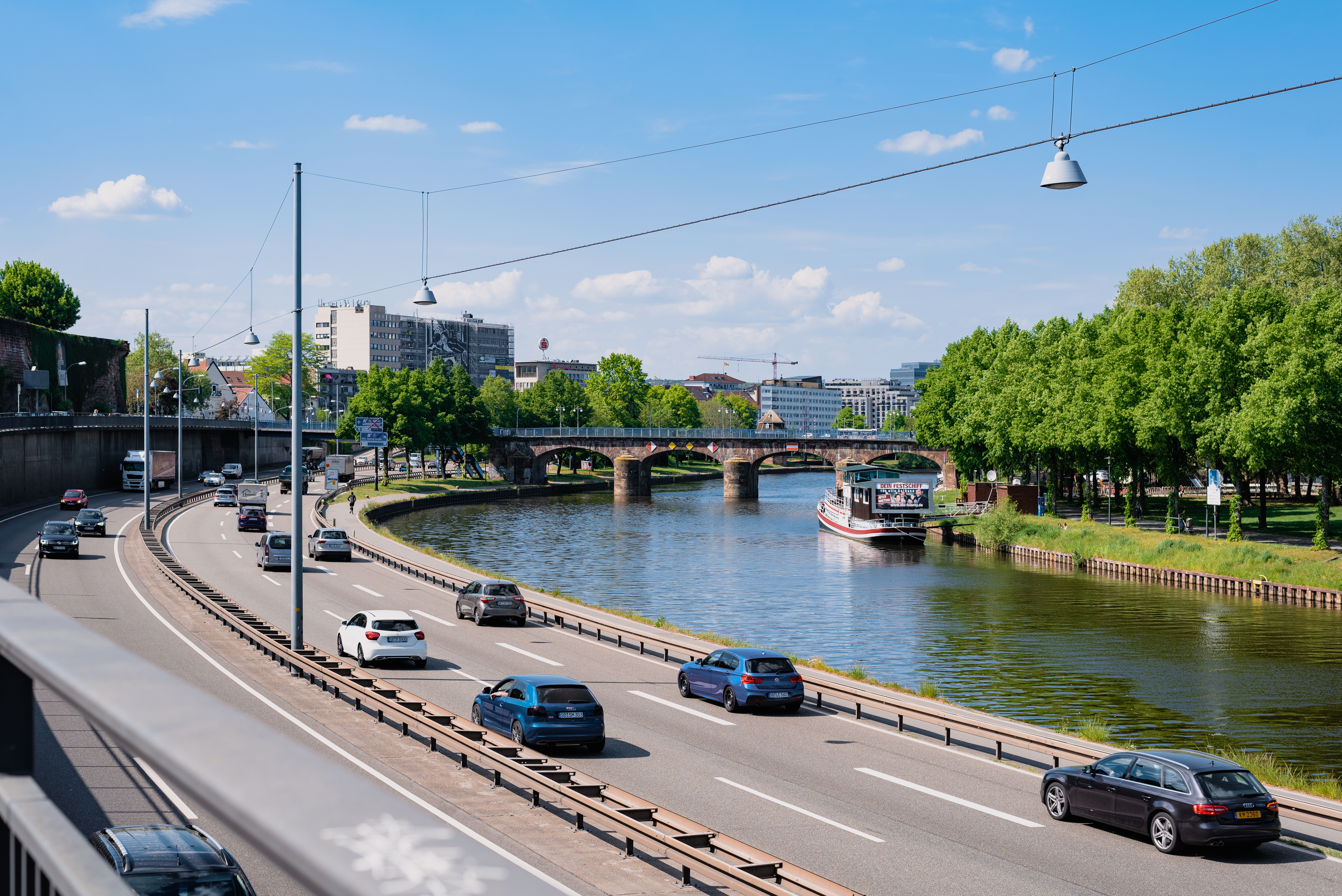
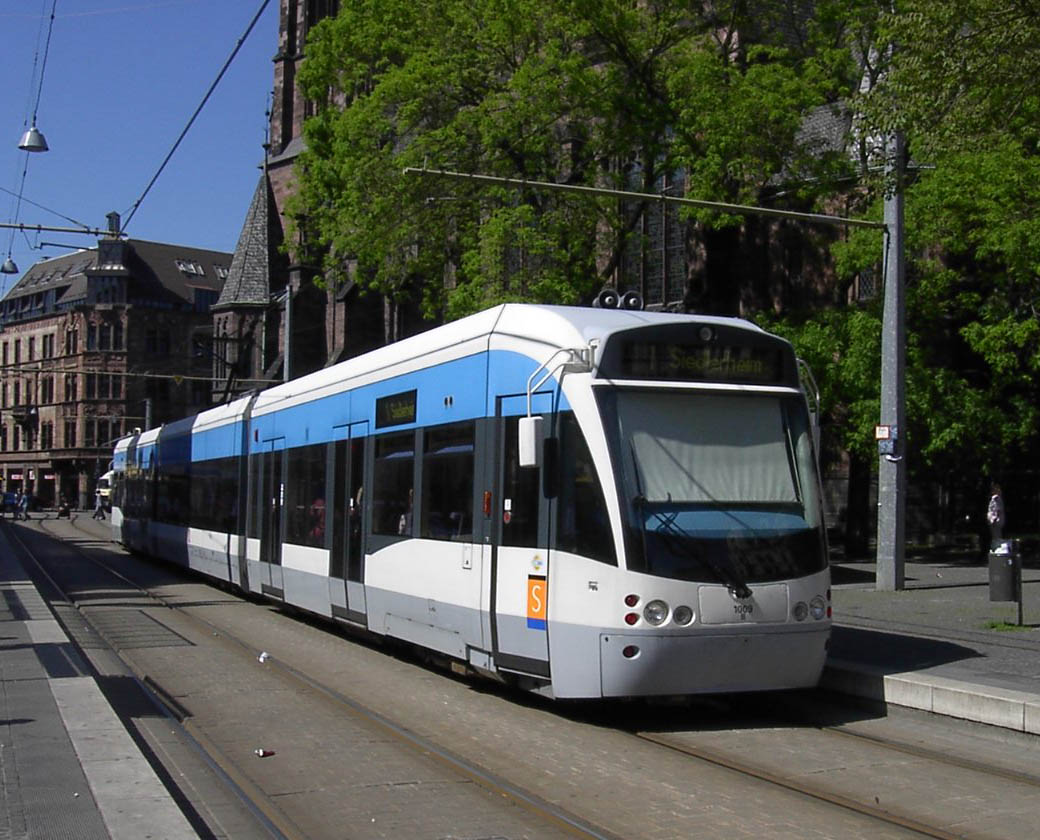
- Rathaus St Johann Berliner Promenade Saarbrücken Castle Universität des Saarlandes Louis' Church Saarland State Theatre A 620 along the Saar Saarbahn

- Flag Coat of arms

- Location of Saarbrücken within Saarbrücken district
- Interactive map of Saarbrücken
- Location within Germany Location within Saarland
- Coordinates: 49°14′N 7°0′E
- Country: Germany
- State: Saarland
- District: Saarbrücken
- Subdivisions: 20

Government
  - Mayor (2019–29): Uwe Conradt (CDU)

Area
  - City: 167.52 km^{2} (64.68 sq mi)
- Elevation: 230.1 m (755 ft)

Population (2025-12-31)
  - City: 182,859
  - Density: 1,091.6/km^{2} (2,827.1/sq mi)
  - Urban: 329,593
  - Metro: 1,000,000
- Time zone: UTC+01:00 (CET)
  - Summer (DST): UTC+02:00 (CEST)
- Postal codes: 66001–66133
- Dialling codes: 0681, 06893, 06897, 06898, 06805
- Vehicle registration: SB
- Website: saarbruecken.de

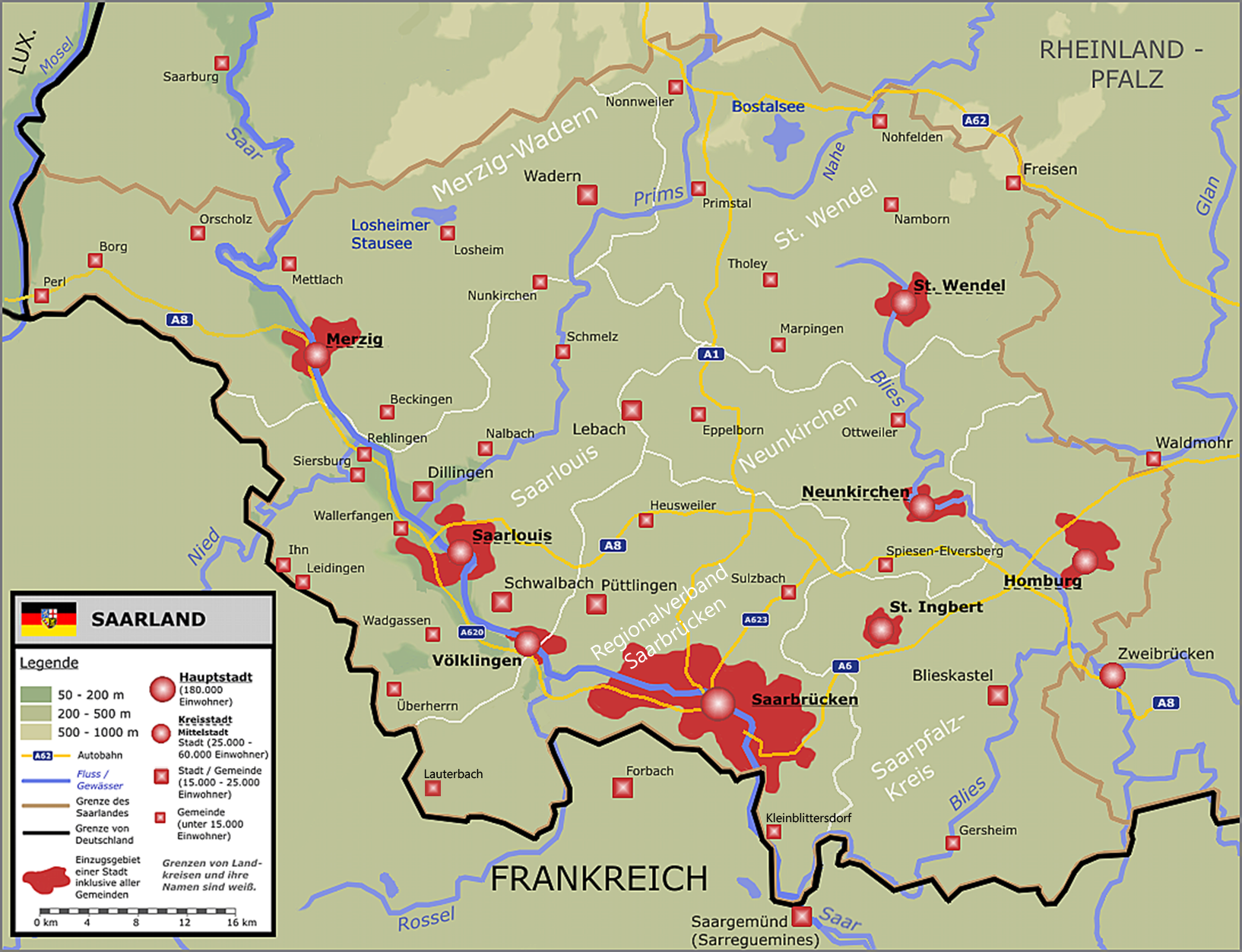
Location of Saarbrücken within the Saarland

Saarbrücken (Note: German: [zaːɐ̯ˈbʁʏkn̩]; Rhine Franconian: Saarbrigge [zaːˈbʁɪɡə]; French: Sarrebruck [saʁbʁyk]; Luxembourgish: Saarbrécken [zaːʁˈbʀekən]; Latin: Saravipons; lit. 'Saar Bridges'.) is the capital and largest city of the state of Saarland, Germany. The city has 181,959 inhabitants and is Saarland's administrative, commercial and cultural centre. It is located on the Saar river (a tributary of the Moselle) and directly borders the French department of Moselle.

The city has an international airport, Saarbrücken Airport, in the borough of Saarbrücken-Ensheim. The main campus of the Saarland University is located within the city forest of Saarbrücken-St Johann. The public broadcaster of the Saarland, Saarländischer Rundfunk, has its seat on the Halberg Mountain in Saarbrücken-Brebach-Fechingen.

Historic landmarks in the city include the stone bridge across the Saar (1546), the Gothic church of St Arnual, the 18th-century Saarbrücken Castle and the old part of the town, the Sankt Johanner Markt (Market of St Johann).

The modern city of Saarbrücken was created in 1909 by the merger of the three cities of Saarbrücken (now called Alt-Saarbrücken), St Johann a. d. Saar and Malstatt-Burbach. It was the industrial and transport centre of the Saar coal-mining region. Products included iron and steel, sugar, beer, pottery, optical instruments, machinery and construction materials. The city twice separated from Germany: from 1920 to 1935, as capital of the Territory of the Saar Basin, and from 1947 to 1956, as capital of the Saar Protectorate.

== Etymology ==
In modern German, Saarbrücken literally translates to 'Saar bridges' (Brücken is the plural of Brücke), and indeed there are about a dozen bridges across the Saar river. However, the name actually predates the oldest bridge in the historic centre of Saarbrücken, the Alte Brücke, by at least 500 years.

The name Saar stems from the Celtic word sara ('streaming water') and the Latin name of the river, Saravus.

There are two hypotheses about the origin of the second part of the name Saarbrücken. Most popular states that the historical name of the town, Sarabrucca, derived from the Celtic word brigā ('hill', or 'rock', 'big stone'), which became Brocken (which means 'rock' or 'boulder') in High German. The castle of Sarabrucca was located on a large rock by the name of Saarbrocken overlooking the river Saar. Another opinion holds that the historical name of the town, Sarabrucca, derived from the Old High German word Brucca, meaning 'bridge', or more precisely a corduroy road, which was also used in fords. Next to the castle, there was a ford allowing land-traffic to cross the Saar.

== History ==
=== Roman Empire ===
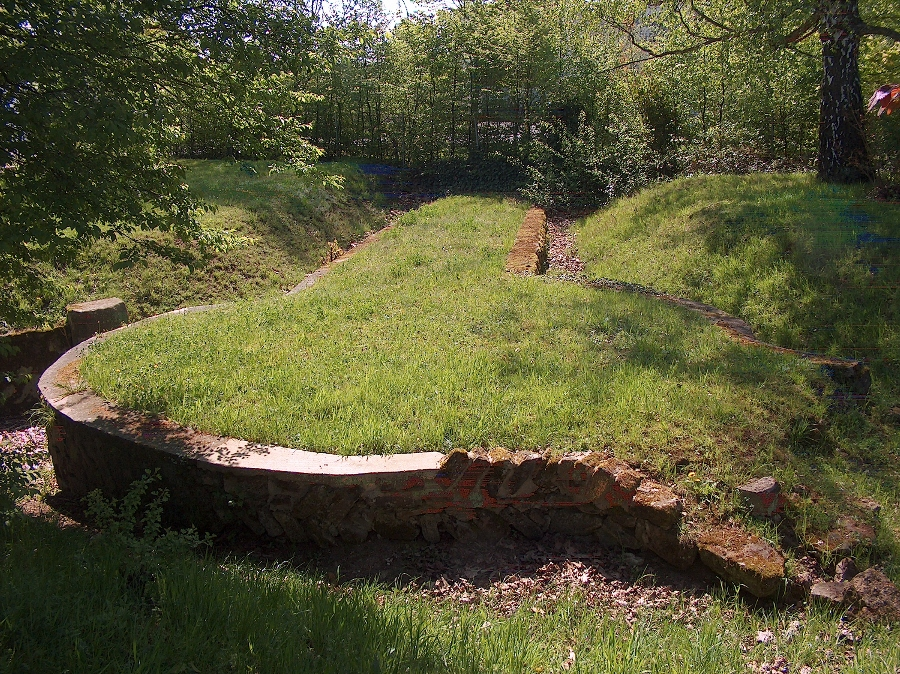
Ruins of the Roman camp Römerkastell

In the last centuries BC, the Mediomatrici settled in the Saarbrücken area. When Julius Caesar conquered Gaul in the first century BC, the area was incorporated into the Roman Empire.

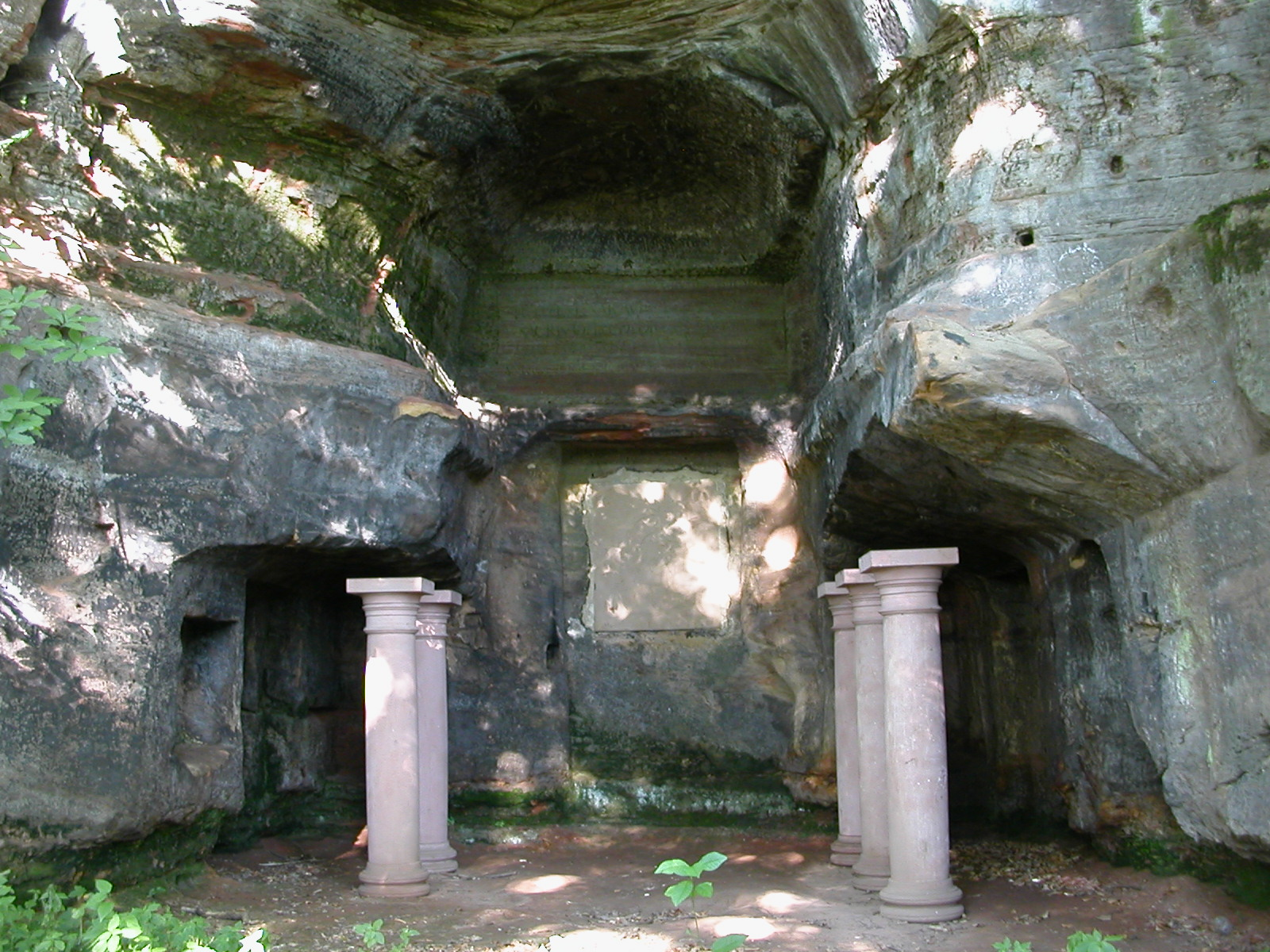
The Mithras shrine at Halberg hill

From the first century AD to the fifth century, there was the Gallo-Roman settlement called vicus Saravus west of Saarbrücken's Halberg hill, on the roads from Metz to Worms and from Trier to Strasbourg. Since the first or second century AD, a wooden bridge, later upgraded to stone, connected vicus Saravus with the south-western bank of the Saar, today's St Arnual, where at least one Roman villa was located. In the third century AD, a Mithras shrine was built in a cave in Halberg hill, on the eastern bank of the Saar river, next to today's old "Osthafen" harbor, and a small Roman camp was constructed at the foot of Halberg hill next to the river.

Toward the end of the fourth century, the Alemanni destroyed the castra and vicus Saravus, removing permanent human presence from the Saarbrücken area for almost a century.

=== Middle Ages to 18th century ===
The Saar area came under the control of the Franks towards the end of the fifth century. In the sixth century, the Merovingians gave the village Merkingen, which had formed on the ruins of the villa on the south-western end of the (in those times still usable) Roman bridge, to the Diocese of Metz. Between 601 and 609, Bishop Arnual founded a community of clerics, a Stift, there. Centuries later the Stift, and in 1046 Merkingen, took on his name, giving birth to St Arnual.

The oldest documentary reference to Saarbrücken is a deed of donation from 999, which documents that Emperor Otto III gave the "castellum Sarabrucca" (Saarbrücken castle) to the Bishops of Metz. The Bishops gave the area to the Counts of Saargau as a fief. By 1120, the county of Saarbrücken had been formed and a small settlement around the castle developed. In 1168, Emperor Barbarossa ordered the slighting of Saarbrücken because of a feud with Count Simon I. The damage cannot have been grave, as the castle continued to exist.

In 1321 or 1322 Count Johann I of Saarbrücken-Commercy gave city status to the settlement of Saarbrücken and the fishing village of St Johann on the opposite bank of the Saar, introducing a joint administration and emancipating the inhabitants from serfdom.

From 1381 to 1793 the counts of Nassau-Saarbrücken were the main local rulers. In 1549, Emperor Charles V prompted the construction of the Alte Brücke (old bridge) connecting Saarbrücken and St Johann. At the beginning of the 17th century, Count Ludwig II ordered the construction of a new Renaissance-style castle on the site of the old castle and founded Saarbrücken's oldest secondary school, the Ludwigsgymnasium. During the Thirty Years' War, the population of Saarbrücken was reduced to just 70 by 1637, down from 4500 in 1628. During the Franco-Dutch War, King Louis XIV's troops burned down Saarbrücken in 1677, almost completely destroying the city such that just 8 houses remained standing. The area was incorporated into France for the first time in the 1680s. In 1697 France was forced to relinquish the Saar province, but from 1793 to 1815 regained control of the region.

During the reign of Prince William Henry from 1741 to 1768, the coal mines were nationalised and his policies created a proto-industrialised economy, laying the foundation for Saarland's later highly industrialised economy. Saarbrücken was booming, and Prince William Henry spent on building and on infrastructure like the Saarkran river crane (1761), far beyond his financial means. However, the famous baroque architect Friedrich Joachim Stengel created not only the Saarkran, but many iconic buildings that still shape Saarbrücken's face today, like the Friedenskirche (Peace Church), which was finished in 1745, the Old City Hall (1750), the catholic St John's Basilica (1754) and the famous Ludwigskirche (1775), Saarbrücken's landmark.

=== 19th century ===
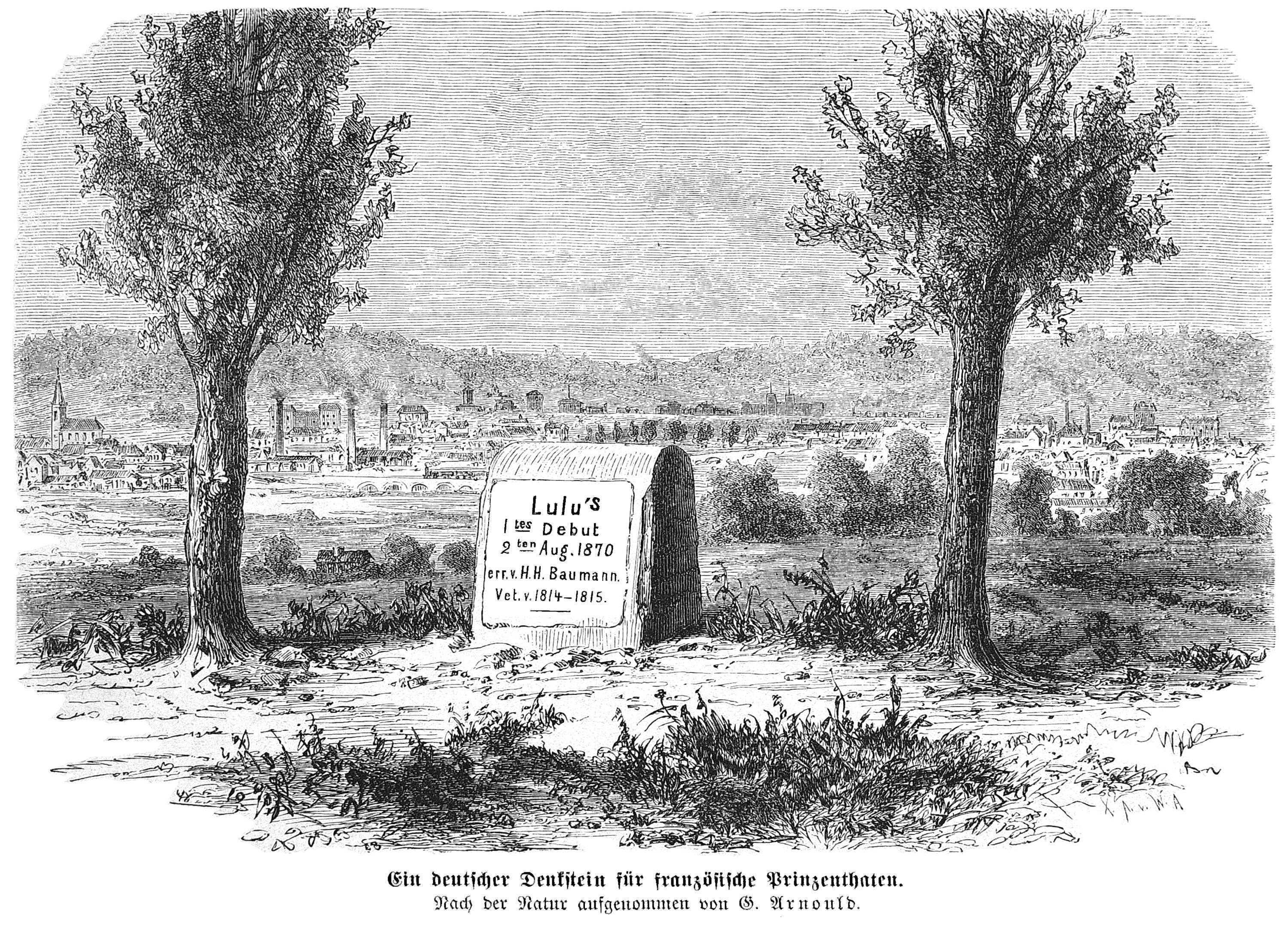
Lulustein in 1871, commemorating Prince Louis Bonaparte's first cannon shot

In 1793, Saarbrücken was captured by French Revolutionary troops and in the treaties of Campo Formio and Lunéville, the county of Saarbrücken was ceded to France.

After 1815 Saarbrücken became part of the Prussian Rhine Province. The office of the mayor of Saarbrücken administered the urban municipalities Saarbrücken and St Johann, and the rural municipalities Malstatt, Burbach, Brebach and Rußhütte. The coal and iron resources of the region were developed: in 1852, a railway connecting the Palatine Ludwig Railway with the French Eastern Railway was constructed, the Burbach ironworks started production in 1856, beginning in 1860 the Saar up to Ensdorf was channeled, and Saarbrücken was connected to the French canal network.

At the start of the Franco-Prussian War, Saarbrücken was the first target of the French invasion force which drove off the Prussian vanguard and occupied Alt-Saarbrücken on 2 August 1870. Oral tradition has it that 14-year-old French Prince Napoléon Eugène Louis Jean Joseph Bonaparte fired his first cannon in this battle, an event commemorated by the Lulustein memorial in Alt-Saarbrücken. On 4 August 1870 the French left Saarbrücken, driven away towards Metz in the Battle of Spicheren on 6 August 1870. Saarbrücken would remain the only German territory occupied by French forces during the conflict.

=== 20th century ===
In 1909 the cities of Saarbrücken, St Johann and Malstatt-Burbach merged and formed the major city of Saarbrücken with a population of over 100,000.

During World War I, factories and railways in Saarbrücken were bombed by British forces. The Royal Naval Air Service raided Saarbrücken with 11 DH4s on 17 October 1917, and a week later with 9 HP11s. The Royal Air Force raided Saarbrücken's railway station with 5 DH9s on 31 July 1918, on which occasion one DH9 crashed near the town centre.

Saarbrücken became capital of the Territory of the Saar Basin established in 1920. Under the Treaty of Versailles (1919), the Saar-Warndt coal mining basin were made the exclusive property of France for a period of 15 years as compensation for the destruction of French mines during the World War I. The treaty also provided for a referendum, at the end of the 15-year period, to determine the territory's future status, and in 1935 more than 90% of the electorate voted for reunification with Germany, while only 0.8% voted for unification with France. The remainder wanted to rejoin Germany but not while the Nazis were in power. This "status quo" group voted for maintenance of the League of Nations' administration. In 1935, the Saar territory rejoined Germany and formed a district under the name Saarland.

==== World War II ====
Saarbrücken was heavily bombed in World War II. In total 1,234 people (1.1 percent of the population) in Saarbrücken were killed in bombing raids from 1942 to 1945. 11,000 homes were destroyed and 75 percent of the city left in ruins. Today more than a third of the city consists of buildings from before 1945.

The British Royal Air Force (RAF) raided Saarbrücken at least 10 times. Often employing area bombing, the RAF used a total of at least 1,495 planes to attack Saarbrücken, killing a minimum of 635 people and heavily damaging more than 8,400 buildings, of which more than 7,700 were completely destroyed, thus dehousing more than 50,000 people. The first major raid on Saarbrücken was undertaken by 291 aircraft of the RAF on 29 July 1942, targeting industrial facilities. Losing nine aircraft, the bombers destroyed almost 400 buildings, damaging more than 300 others, and killed more than 150 people. On 28 August 1942, 113 RAF planes raided Saarbrücken doing comparatively little damage due to widely scattered bombing. After the RAF mistakenly bombed Saarlouis instead of Saarbrücken on 1 September 1942, it raided Saarbrücken with 118 planes on 19 September 1942, causing comparatively little damage as the bombing scattered to the west of Saarbrücken due to ground haze. There were small raids with 28 Mosquitos on 30 April 1944, with 33 Mosquitos on 29 June 1944, and with just 2 Mosquitos on 26 July 1944. At the request of the American Third Army, the RAF put on a large raid with more than 500 Avro Lancaster heavy bombers against Saarbrücken on 5 October 1944, to block and destroy supply lines, especially the railway. Only three Lancasters were lost and destroyed large parts of Malstatt and nearly all of Altstadt of Saarbrücken. The RAF made three raids on the railway yards during day of 13 January, that night and the following day of 14 January with 158, 274 and 134 aircraft, respectively; the nighttime raid was rated as "extremely accurate and effective".

The 8th US Air Force raided Saarbrücken at least 16 times, from 4 October 1943, to 9 November 1944. Targeting mostly the marshalling yards, a total of at least 2,387 planes of the 8th USAF killed a minimum of 543 people and heavily damaged more than 4,400 buildings, of which more than 700 were completely destroyed, thus depriving more than 2,300 people of shelter. Donald J. Gott and William E. Metzger Jr. were posthumously awarded the Medal of Honor for their actions during the bombing run on 9 November 1944.

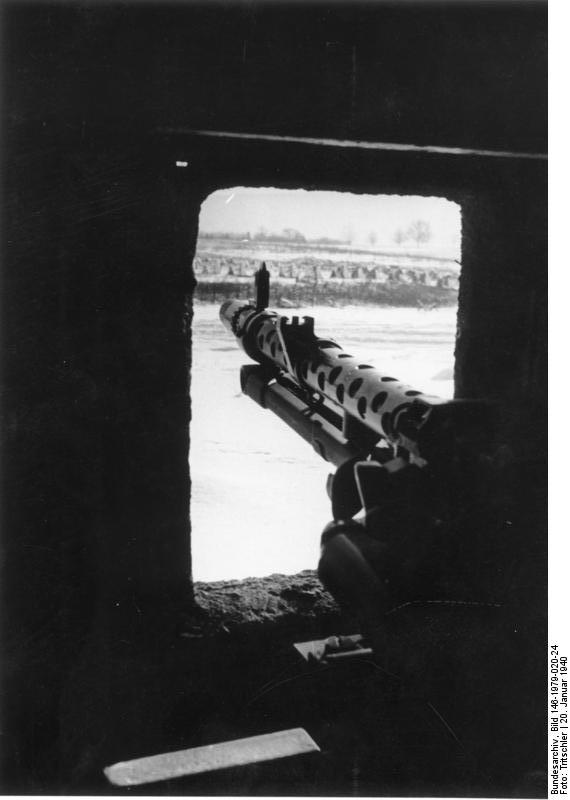
Machine gun emplacement of a bunker. Saarbrücken, 1940.

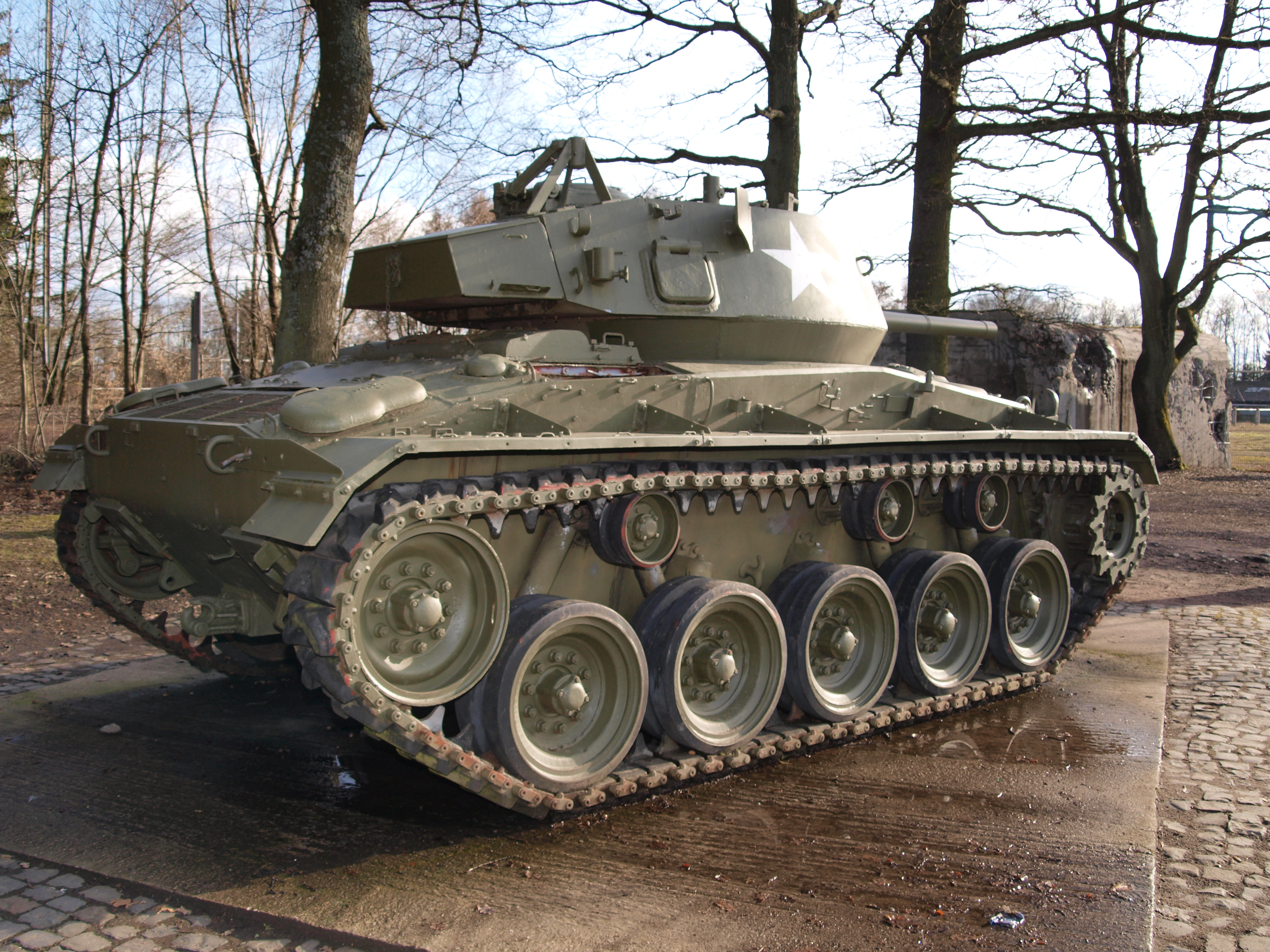
M24 Chaffee, donated by veterans of the 70th Infantry Division, facing ruins of fortifications at Spicheren Heights

On the ground, Saarbrücken was defended by the 347th Infantry Division commanded by Wolf-Günther Trierenberg in 1945. The US 70th Infantry Division was tasked with punching through the Siegfried Line and taking Saarbrücken. As the fortifications were unusually strong, it first had to take the Siegfried Line fortifications on the French heights near Spicheren overlooking Saarbrücken. This Spichern-Stellung had been constructed in 1940 after the French had fallen back on the Maginot Line during the Phoney War. The 276th Infantry Regiment attacked Forbach on 19 February 1945, and a fierce battle ensued, halting the American advance at the rail-road tracks cutting through Forbach on 22 February 1945. The 274th and 275th Infantry Regiments took Spicheren on 20 February 1945. When the 274th Infantry Regiment captured the Spicheren Heights on 23 February 1945, after a heavy battle on the previous day, the Germans counter-attacked for days, but by 27 February 1945, the heights were fully under American control. A renewed attack on 3 March 1945, allowed units of the 70th Infantry Division to enter Stiring-Wendel and the remainder of Forbach. By 5 March 1945, all of Forbach and major parts of Stiring-Wendel had been taken. However, fighting for Stiring-Wendel, especially for the Simon mine, continued for days. After the German defenders of Stiring-Wendel fell back to Saarbrücken on 12 and 13 March 1945, the 70th Infantry Division still faced a strong segment of the Siegfried Line, which had been reinforced around Saarbrücken as late as 1940. After having the German troops south of the Saar fall back across the Saar at night, the German defenders of Saarbrücken retreated early on 20 March 1945. The 70th Infantry Division flanked Saarbrücken by crossing the Saar north-west of Saarbrücken. The 274th Infantry Regiment entered Saarbrücken on 20 March 1945, fully occupying it the following day, thus ending the war for Saarbrücken.

==== After World War II ====
In 1945, Saarbrücken temporarily became part of the French occupation zone in Germany. In 1947, France created the nominally politically independent Saar Protectorate and merged it economically with France to exploit the area's vast coal reserves. Saarbrücken became capital of the new Saar state. A referendum in 1955 came out with over two-thirds of the voters rejecting an independent Saar state. The area rejoined the West Germany on 1 January 1957, sometimes called Kleine Wiedervereinigung, which literally means "Little reunification". Economic reintegration would, however, take many more years. Saarbrücken became capital of the federal state Saarland. After the administrative reform of 1974, the city had a population of more than 200,000.

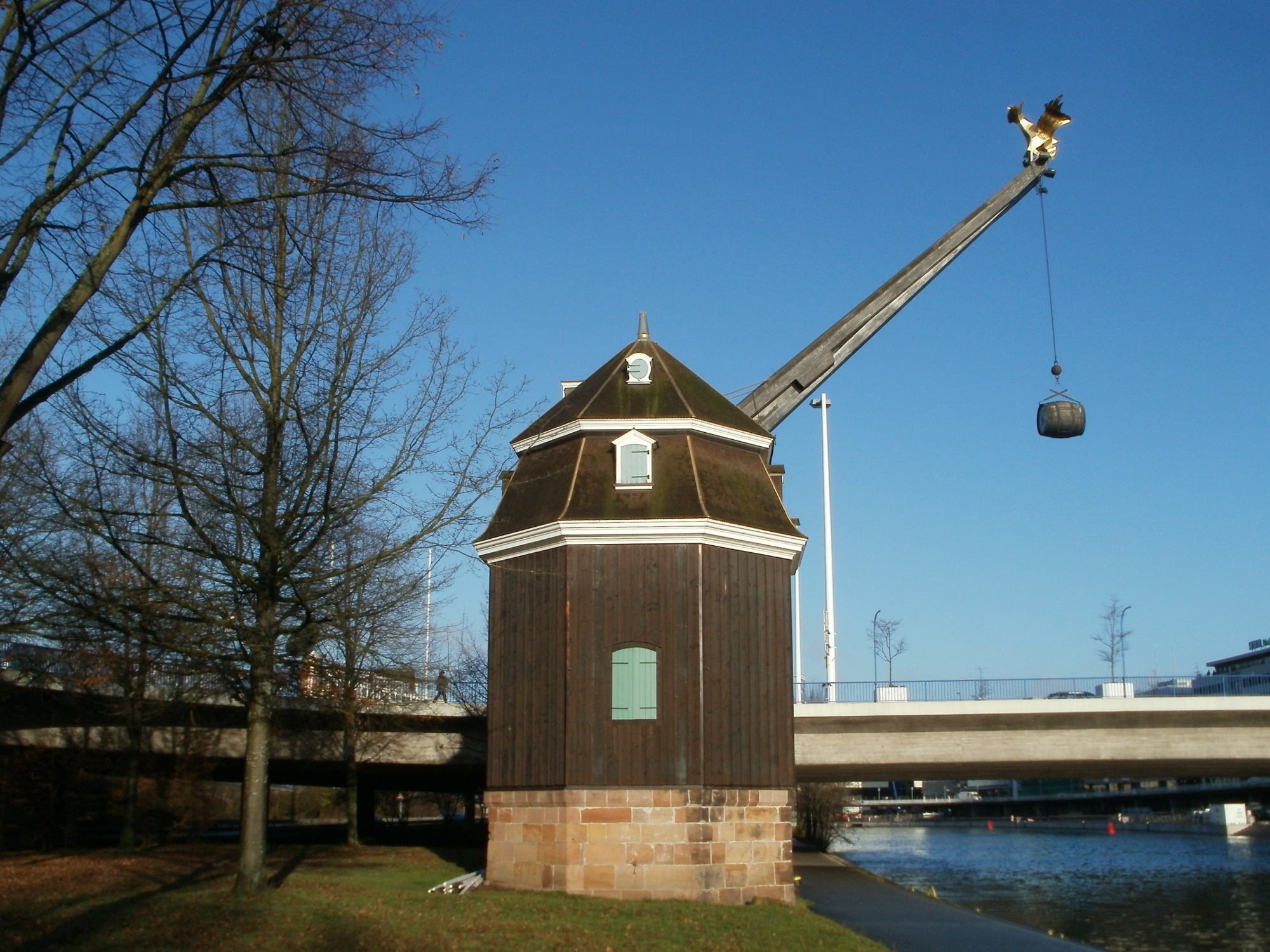
Saarkran, reconstructed next to William-Henry-Bridge in 1991

From 1990 to 1993, students and an arts professor from the town first secretly, then officially, created an invisible memorial to Jewish cemeteries. It is located on the fore-court of the Saarbrücken Castle.

On 9 March 1999 at 4:40 AM, there was a bomb attack on the controversial Wehrmacht exhibition next to Saarbrücken Castle, resulting in minor damage to the Volkshochschule building housing the exhibition and the adjoining Schlosskirche church; this attack did not cause any injuries.

== Geography ==
=== Climate ===
Climate in this area has mild differences between highs and lows, and there is adequate rainfall year-round. The Köppen climate classification subtype for this climate is "Cfb" (Marine West Coast Climate/Oceanic climate).

Saarbrücken's highest recorded temperature was 41.4 °C (106.5 °F) on 27 June 2026.

Climate data for Saarbrücken (1991–2026 normals, extremes since 1935)
Month	Jan	Feb	Mar	Apr	May	Jun	Jul	Aug	Sep	Oct	Nov	Dec	Year
Record high °C (°F)	14.5 (58.1)	20.5 (68.9)	24.0 (75.2)	27.7 (81.9)	31.2 (88.2)	41.4 (106.5)	37.7 (99.9)	37.1 (98.8)	32.2 (90.0)	26.5 (79.7)	21.2 (70.2)	17.1 (62.8)	41.4 (106.5)
Mean daily maximum °C (°F)	4.0 (39.2)	5.7 (42.3)	10.3 (50.5)	14.9 (58.8)	18.7 (65.7)	22.1 (71.8)	24.2 (75.6)	24.0 (75.2)	19.5 (67.1)	14.1 (57.4)	8.2 (46.8)	4.7 (40.5)	14.2 (57.6)
Daily mean °C (°F)	1.5 (34.7)	2.3 (36.1)	5.8 (42.4)	9.7 (49.5)	13.5 (56.3)	16.8 (62.2)	18.7 (65.7)	18.3 (64.9)	14.2 (57.6)	10.0 (50.0)	5.4 (41.7)	2.4 (36.3)	9.9 (49.8)
Mean daily minimum °C (°F)	−1.0 (30.2)	−0.8 (30.6)	1.8 (35.2)	4.7 (40.5)	8.3 (46.9)	11.5 (52.7)	13.4 (56.1)	13.2 (55.8)	9.6 (49.3)	6.4 (43.5)	2.7 (36.9)	0.0 (32.0)	5.8 (42.4)
Record low °C (°F)	−17.2 (1.0)	−20.8 (−5.4)	−14.9 (5.2)	−6.0 (21.2)	−2.3 (27.9)	0.0 (32.0)	3.7 (38.7)	3.9 (39.0)	−0.5 (31.1)	−6.1 (21.0)	−11.7 (10.9)	−18.7 (−1.7)	−20.8 (−5.4)
Average precipitation mm (inches)	76.2 (3.00)	65.2 (2.57)	65.1 (2.56)	50.0 (1.97)	73.3 (2.89)	63.5 (2.50)	75.3 (2.96)	71.1 (2.80)	66.5 (2.62)	74.1 (2.92)	80.7 (3.18)	99.9 (3.93)	861.0 (33.90)
Average precipitation days (≥ 1.0 mm)	17.3	15.7	14.6	12.6	14.2	13.1	13.9	13.5	12.6	15.6	17.8	19.1	179.9
Average snowy days (≥ 1.0 cm)	6.8	5.0	1.7	0.1	0	0	0	0	0	0	1.6	5.0	20.2
Average relative humidity (%)	87.5	82.2	74.9	68.6	71.4	71.1	69.9	71.9	78.3	84.9	89.1	89.5	78.3
Mean monthly sunshine hours	53.5	80.9	137.0	190.5	214.3	230.8	244.2	225.9	171.0	106.0	52.8	42.1	1,748.9
Source 1: World Meteorological Organization
Source 2: Infoclimat

=== Region ===
Some of the closest cities are Trier, Luxembourg, Nancy, Metz, Kaiserslautern, Karlsruhe and Mannheim. Saarbrücken is connected by the city's public transport network to the town of Sarreguemines in France and to the neighboring town of Völklingen, where the old steel works were the first industrial monument to be declared a World Heritage Site by UNESCO in 1994 – the Völklingen Ironworks.

== Demographics ==
Historical population
Year	Pop.	±%
1871	7,680	—
1895	17,082	+122.4%
1910	105,089	+515.2%
1919	110,623	+5.3%
1927	125,020	+13.0%
1935	129,085	+3.3%
1946	89,709	−30.5%
1951	111,450	+24.2%
1961	131,732	+18.2%
1970	128,251	−2.6%
1975	205,366	+60.1%
1980	193,554	−5.8%
1985	186,229	−3.8%
1990	191,694	+2.9%
2000	183,257	−4.4%
2011	175,853	−4.0%
2022	179,296	+2.0%
Population size may be affected by changes in administrative divisions.

Saarbrücken has a population of about 180,000. In 1957, when Saar Protectorate and Saarbrücken transformed to Saarland and became a part of West Germany, it had a population of about 125,000. In the 1960s many Italian guest workers came to Saarbrücken, since then Italians are the largest number of foreigners in Saarbrücken. The 2nd largest foreign groups are the French people due to its former part of France and the fact that Saarbrücken is located on the French border. Saarbrücken reached its highest number of population in 1975 when it had about 205,000 people. With a population of about 180,000 people, today Saarbrücken is the 2nd smallest German state capital after Schwerin.

Largest groups of foreign residents
Country of birth	Population (2022)
Italy	4,051
France	2,492
Turkey	2,345
Ukraine	2,138
Romania	1,755
Syria	1,524
Croatia	1,346
Poland	1,230
Greece	1,176
Bulgaria	1,083
Spain	1,000

== Politics ==
=== Mayor ===
Results of the second round of the 2019 mayoral election

The current mayor of Saarbrücken is Uwe Conradt of the Christian Democratic Union (CDU) since 2019. The most recent mayoral election was held on 26 May 2019, with a runoff held on 9 June, and the results were as follows:

Candidate	Party	First round		Second round	
Candidate	Party	Votes	%	Votes	%
Charlotte Britz	Social Democratic Party	27,070	36.8	22,429	49.7
Uwe Conradt	Christian Democratic Union	21,342	29.0	22,703	50.3
Barbara Meyer-Gluche	Alliance 90/The Greens	10,578	14.4		
Markus Lein	The Left	5,075	6.9		
Lale Hadjimohamadvali	Alternative for Germany	3,316	4.5		
Gerald Kallenborn	Free Democratic Party	2,975	4.0		
Michael Franke	Die PARTEI	2,715	3.7		
Otfried Best	National Democratic Party	469	0.6		
Valid votes		73,540	98.7	45,132	98.8
Invalid votes		1,001	1.3	570	1.2
Total		74,541	100.0	45,702	100.0
Electorate/voter turnout		136,949	54.4	137,071	33.3
Source: City of Saarbrücken (1st round, 2nd round)

=== City council ===
Winning party by precinct in the 2019 city council election

The city council governs the city alongside the Mayor. The most recent city council election was held on 26 May 2019, and the results were as follows:

Party	Votes	%	+/-	Seats	+/-
Christian Democratic Union (CDU)	19,085	26.0	▼3.3	18	▼1
Social Democratic Party (SPD)	18,462	25.2	▼5.2	17	▼3
Alliance 90/The Greens (Grüne)	14,616	19.9	▲9.1	13	▲6
The Left (Die Linke)	7,065	9.6	▼2.3	6	▼2
Alternative for Germany (AfD)	5,079	6.9	▲2.2	4	▲1
Free Democratic Party (FDP)	3,855	5.3	▲1.2	3	▲1
Die PARTEI (PARTEI)	2,550	3.5	New	2	New
Pirate Party Germany (Piraten)	1,052	1.4	▼2.1	0	▼2
Free Voters (FW)	726	1.0	▼1.1	0	▼1
Saarland for All (SfA)	457	0.6	▼0.4	0	±0
National Democratic Party (NPD)	369	0.5	▼1.5	0	▼1
Valid votes	73,316	98.3			
Invalid votes	1,235	1.7			
Total	74,551	100.0		63	±0
Electorate/voter turnout	136,949	54.4	▲11.4		
Source: City of Saarbrücken

== Infrastructure ==
The city is served by Saarbrücken Airport (SCN). However, the airport only provides direct routes to limited destinations. The nearest larger international airport is Frankfurt Airport, located 169 km (105 mi) north east of the city centre.

Since June 2007, ICE high speed train services along the LGV Est line provide high speed connections to Paris from Saarbrücken Hauptbahnhof. Saarbrücken's Saarbahn (modelled on the Karlsruhe model light rail) crosses the French-German border, connecting to the French city of Sarreguemines.

=== Science and education ===
Saarbrücken is also the home of the main campus of Saarland University (Universität des Saarlandes). There are several research institutes and centres on or near the campus, including:

- the Max Planck Institute for Informatics,
- the Max Planck Institute for Software Systems,
- the Helmholtz Centre for Information Security,
- the Fraunhofer Institute for Non-destructive Testing,
- the German Research Centre for Artificial Intelligence,
- the centre for Bioinformatics,
- the Europa-Institut,
- the Korea Institute of Science and Technology Europe Research Society,
- the Leibniz Institute for New Materials (INM),
- the Intel Visual Computing Institute (2009-2019),
- the CISPA Helmholtz Centre for Information Security,
- the Society for Environmentally Compatible Process Technology,
- the Institut für Angewandte Informationsforschung for applied linguistics,
- several institutes focusing on transfer of technology between academia and companies, and the Science Park Saar startup incubator.

The Saarland University also has a Centre Juridique Franco-Allemand, offering a French and a German law degree program.

The Botanischer Garten der Universität des Saarlandes (a botanical garden) was closed in 2016 due to budget cuts.

The main campus of the Saarland University also houses the office of the Schloss Dagstuhl – Leibniz-Zentrum für Informatik computer science research and meeting centre.

Furthermore, Saarbrücken houses the administration of the Franco-German University (Deutsch-Französische Hochschule), a French-German cooperation of 180 institutions of tertiary education mainly from France and Germany but also from Bulgaria, Canada, Spain, Luxembourg, Netherlands, Poland, Great Britain, Russia and Switzerland, which offers bi-national French-German degree programs and doctorates as well as tri-national degree programs.

Saarbrücken houses several other institutions of tertiary education as well:

- the University of Applied Sciences Hochschule für Technik und Wirtschaft des Saarlandes,
- the University of Arts Hochschule der Bildenden Künste Saar,
- the University of Music Hochschule für Musik Saar,
- the private Fachhochschule for health promotion and physical fitness Deutsche Hochschule für Prävention und Gesundheitsmanagement
- the Höhere Berufsfachschule für Wirtschaftsinformatik (HBFS-WI) providing higher vocational education and awarding the degree "Staatlich geprüfte(r) Wirtschaftsinformatiker(in)" (English: "state-examined business business informatics/software engineer")

Saarbrücken also houses a Volkshochschule.

With the end of coal mining in the Saar region, Saarbrücken's Fachhochschule for mining, the Fachhochschule für Bergbau Saar, was closed at the beginning of the 21st century. The Diocese of Trier's Katholische Hochschule für Soziale Arbeit, a Fachhochschule for social work, was closed in 2008 for cost cutting reasons. The Saarland's Fachhochschule for administrative personnel working for the government, the Fachhochschule für Verwaltung des Saarlandes, was moved from Saarbrücken to Göttelborn in 2012.

Saarbrücken houses several institutions of primary and secondary education. Notable is the Saarland's oldest grammar school, the Ludwigsgymnasium, which was founded in 1604 as a latin school. The building of Saarbrücken's bi-lingual French-German Deutsch-Französisches Gymnasium, founded in 1961 and operating as a laboratory school under the Élysée Treaty, also houses the École française de Sarrebruck et Dilling, a French primary school which offers bi-lingual German elements. Together with several Kindergartens offering bi-lingual French-German education, Saarbrücken thus offers a full bi-lingual French-German formal education.

== Sport ==
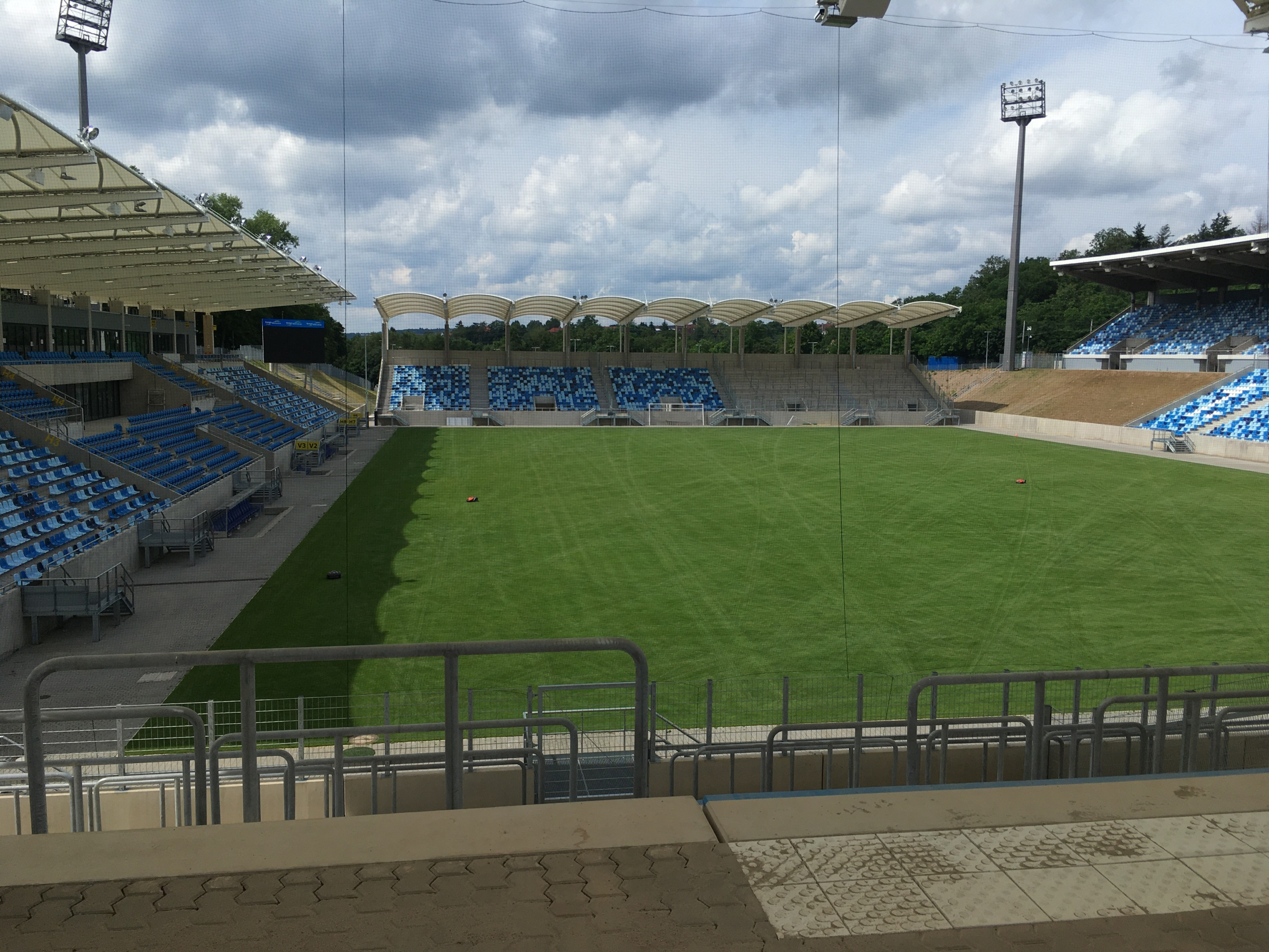
Ludwigsparkstadion

The city is home to several different teams, most notable of which is association football team based at the Ludwigsparkstadion, 1. FC Saarbrücken, which also has a reserve team and a women's section. In the past a top-flight team, twice the country's vice-champions, 5-time DFB-Pokal semi-finalists and was a participant in UEFA Champions League, the club draws supporters from across the region.

Lower league SV Saar 05 Saarbrücken is the other football team in the city.

The Saarland Hurricanes are one of the top American football teams in the country, with its junior team winning the German Junior Bowl in 2013.

Various sporting events are held at the Saarlandhalle, most notable of which was the badminton Bitburger Open Grand Prix Gold, part of the BWF Grand Prix Gold and Grand Prix tournaments, held in 2012 and 2013.

== International relations ==
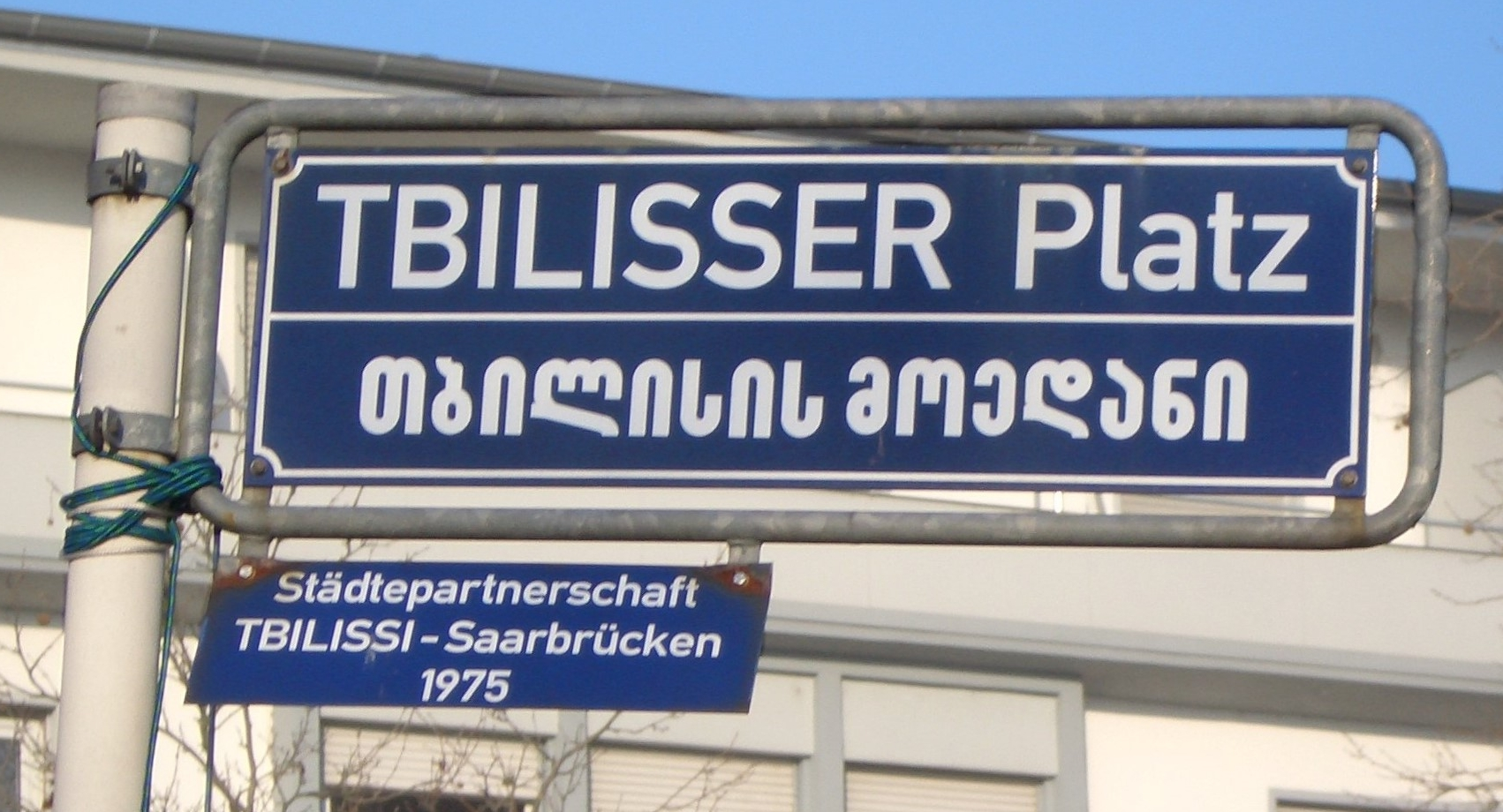
Tbilisser Platz, Saarbrücken named after Tbilisi, Georgia

Saarbrücken is a fellow member of the QuattroPole union of cities, along with Luxembourg, Metz and Trier (formed by cities from three neighbouring countries: Germany, Luxembourg and France).

=== Twin towns – sister cities ===
Saarbrücken is twinned with:

- Nantes, France (1965)
- (Georgia (country)) Tbilisi, Georgia (1975) (suspended due to political developments in Georgia)
- Cottbus, Germany (1987)
- Kovel, Ukraine (2023)

Borough of Altenkessel is twinned with:

- Coucy-le-Château-Auffrique, France

Borough of Dudweiler is twinned with:

- Saint-Avold, France

Borough of Klarenthal is twinned with:

- Schœneck, France

=== Friendly cities ===
Saarbrücken has friendly relations with:

- Diriamba, Nicaragua

Borough of Dudweiler has friendly relations with:

- Duttweiler, a borough of Neustadt an der Weinstraße, Germany

== Notable people ==
=== Arts ===
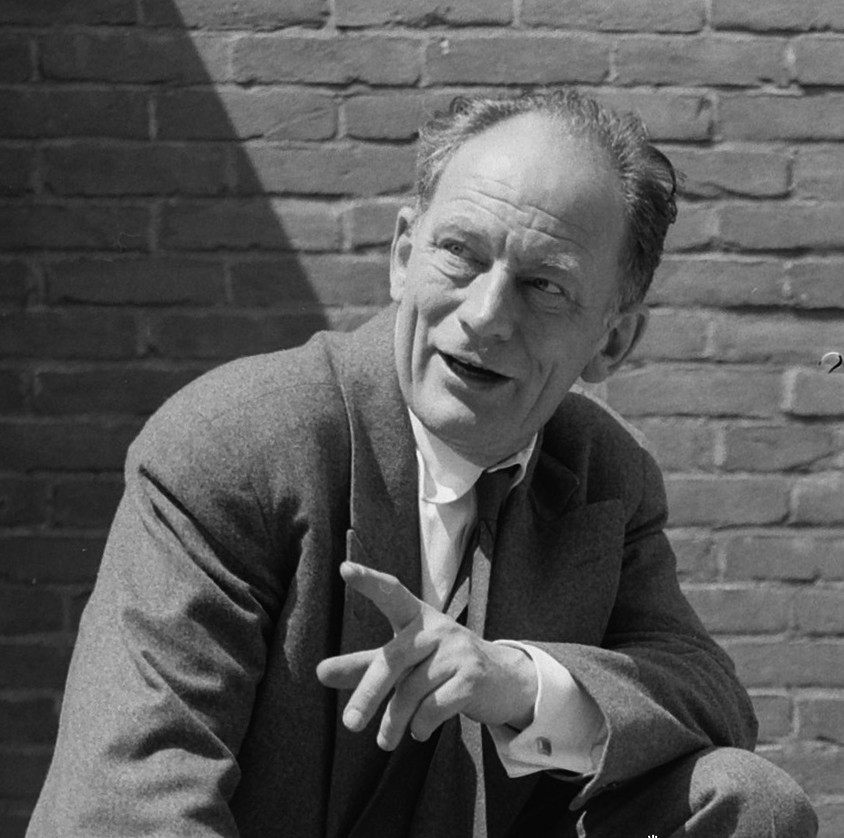
Wolfgang Staudte, 1955

- Frédéric Back (1924–2013), Canadian artist and film director of short animated films
- Egbert Baqué (born 1952), gallerist, author and translator
- Margot Benary-Isbert (1889–1979), author
- Ingrid Caven (born 1938), actress
- Inéz (born 1990), singer
- Sandra Cretu (born 1962), singer
- Nicole Seibert (born 1964), singer
- Max Ophüls (1902–1957), film director
- Edmond Pottier (1855–1934), French art historian and archaeologist
- Rolf Riehm (1937–2026), composer, oboist and academic teacher
- Carl Röchling (1855–1920), painter and illustrator
- Wolfgang Staudte (1906–1984), film director
- Otto Steinert (1915–1978), photographer
- Saskia Vester (born 1959), actress and author
- Markus Zahnhausen (born 1965), recorder player

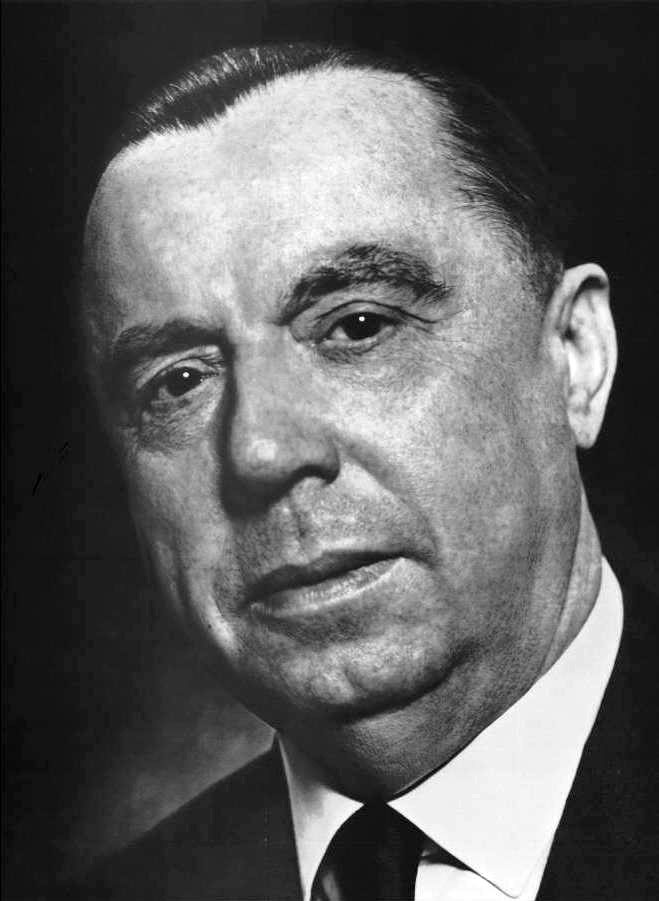
Peter Altmeier, 1963

=== Public service ===
- Peter Altmeier (1899–1977), politician (Centre, CDU)
- Michel Antoine (1925–2015), French historian
- Karl-Heinz Paque (born 1956), politician (FDP)
- Rudolf Arthur Pfeiffer (1931–2012), German geneticist. He discovered the Pfeiffer syndrome in 1964.
- Walther Poppelreuter (1886–1939), neurologist and psychiatrist
- Alfred Sturm (1888–1962), lieutenant general in World War II
- Rudolf Schmeer (1905–1966), politician (NSDAP) and civil servant
- Walter Schellenberg (1910–1952), senior SS officer
- Gerhard Schröder (1910–1989), politician (CDU)
- Frederic Vester (1925–2003), biochemist
- Hans Wagner (1896–1967), lieutenant general in World War II

=== Sport ===
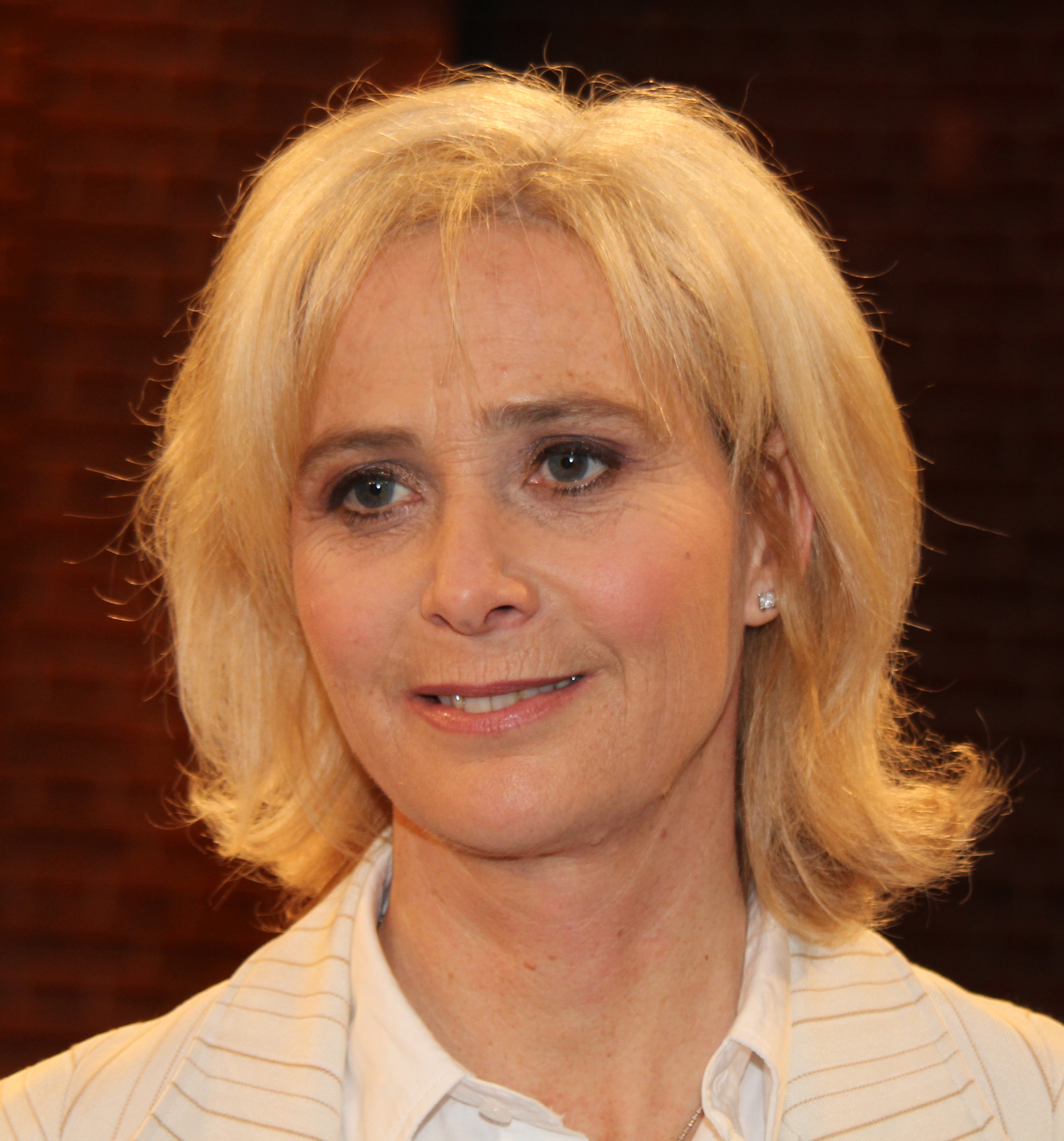
Claudia Kohde-Kilsch, 2012

- Christian Hohenadel (born 1976), racing driver
- Jonas Hector (born 1990), footballer
- Adolf Kertész (1892–1920), Hungarian footballer, settled in Saarbrücken
- Werner Klein (born 1950), racing driver and entrepreneur
- Claudia Kohde-Kilsch (born 1963), tennis player and politician
- Lisa Klein (born 1996), cyclist
- Gerd Peehs (born 1942), footballer

=== Honorary citizens ===
- Tzvi Avni (born 1927), Israeli composer
- Max Braun, (German Wiki) (1892–1945), politician and journalist, renowned for his fight against Nazism, especially over the Saar status.
- Willi Graf (1918–1943), member of the White Rose resistance group

== Gallery ==
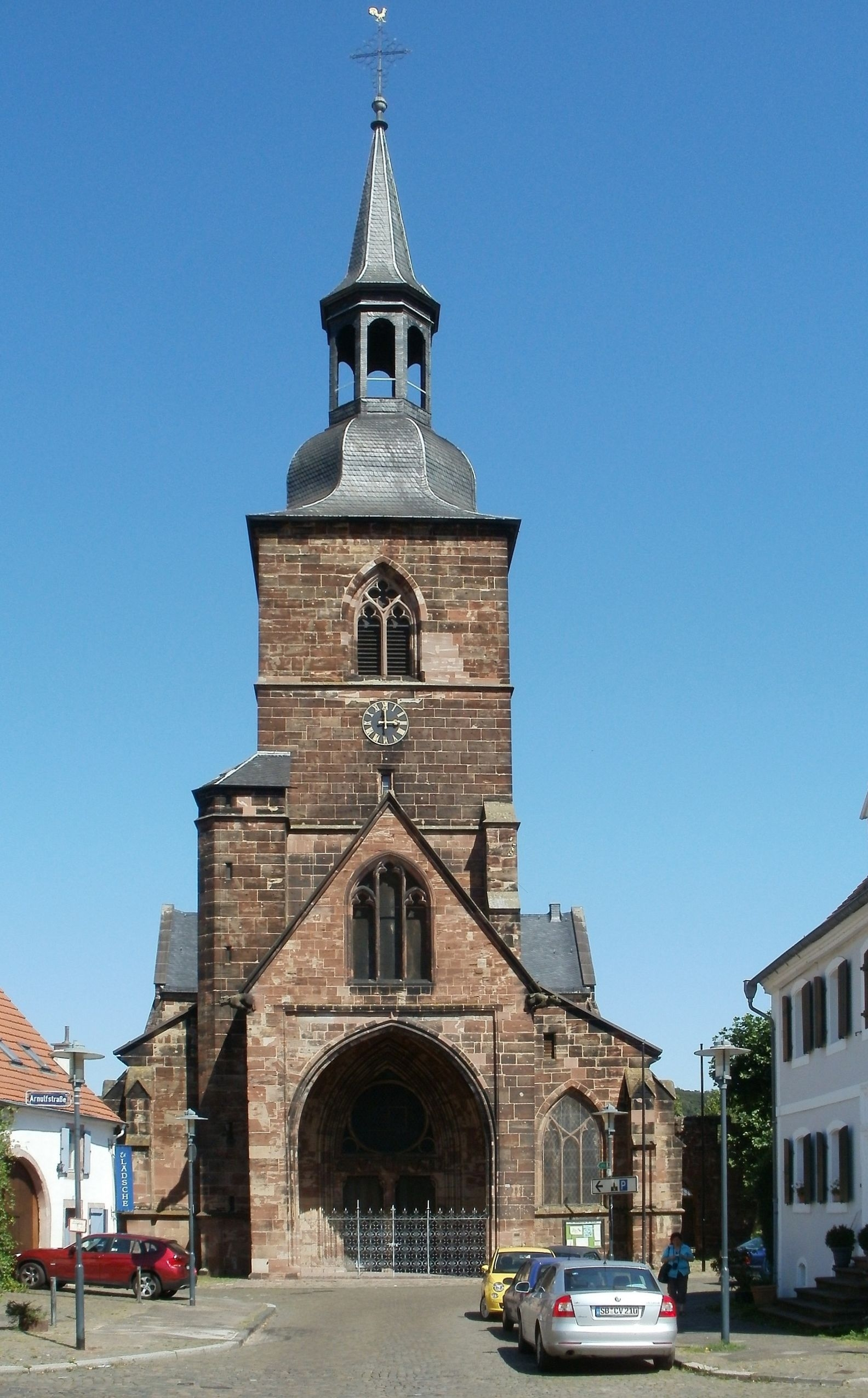
Stiftskirche St Arnual

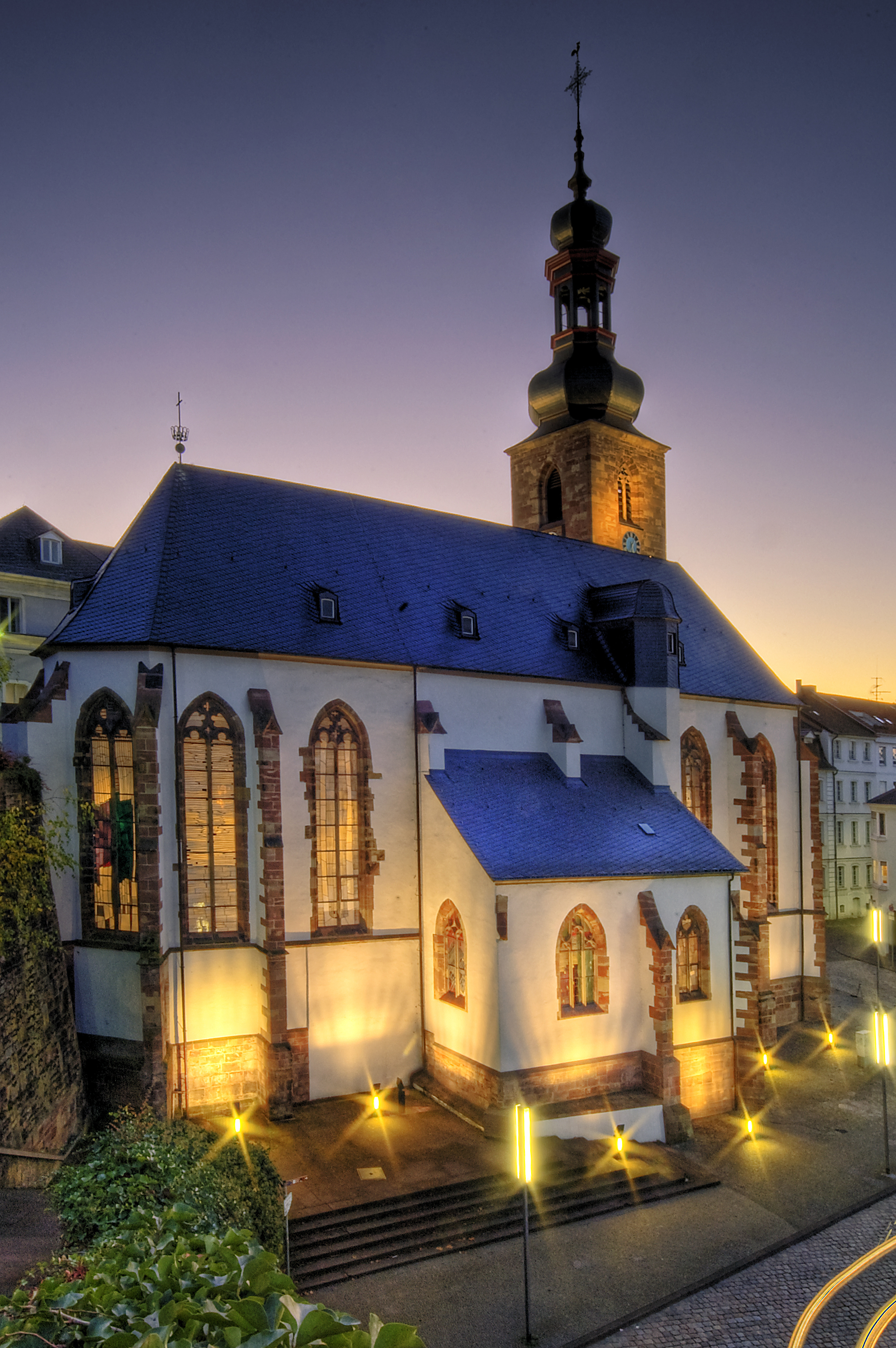
Schlosskirche St Nikolaus

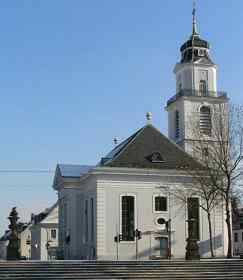
Friedenskirche, seen from Ludwigsplatz

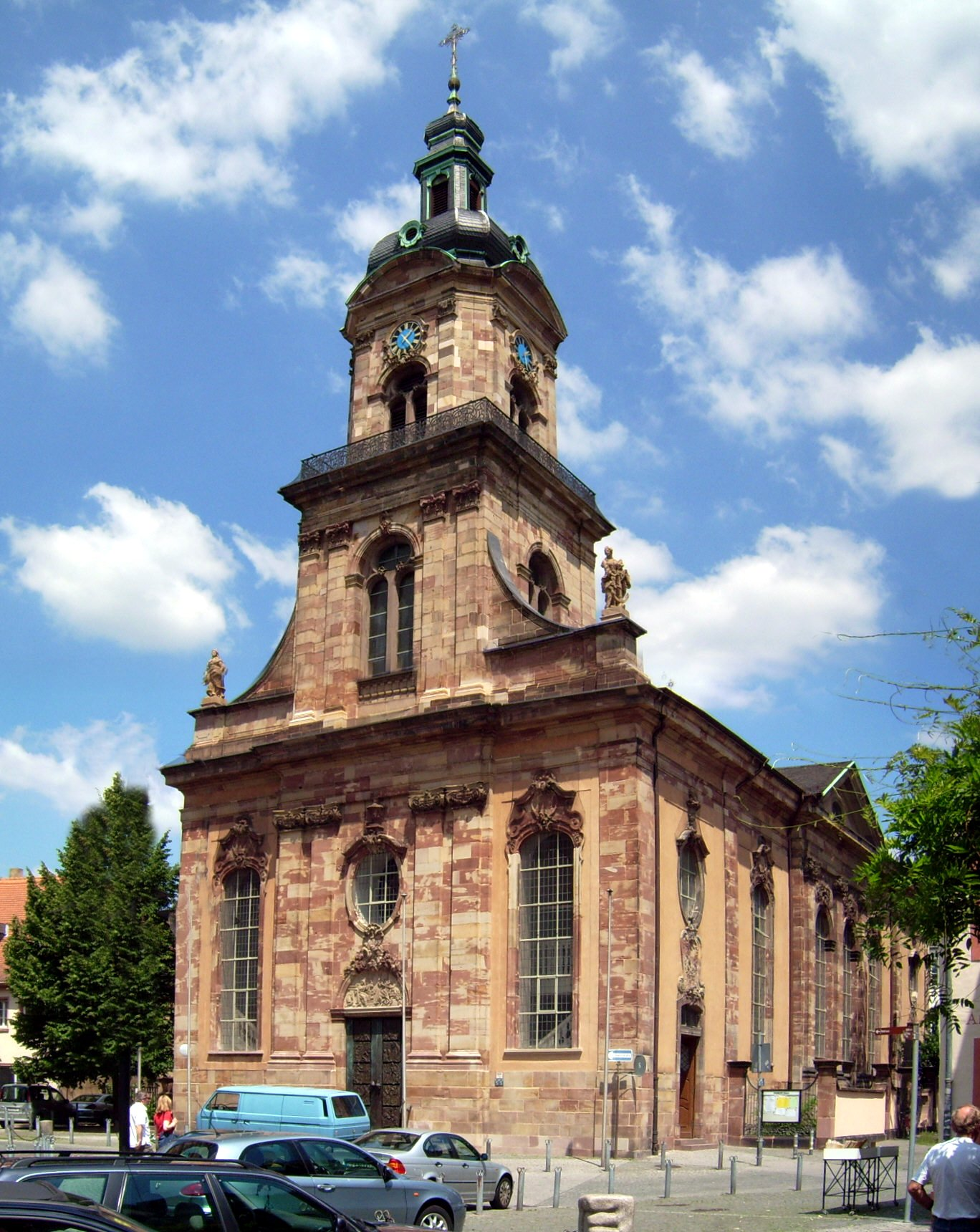
St John's Basilica

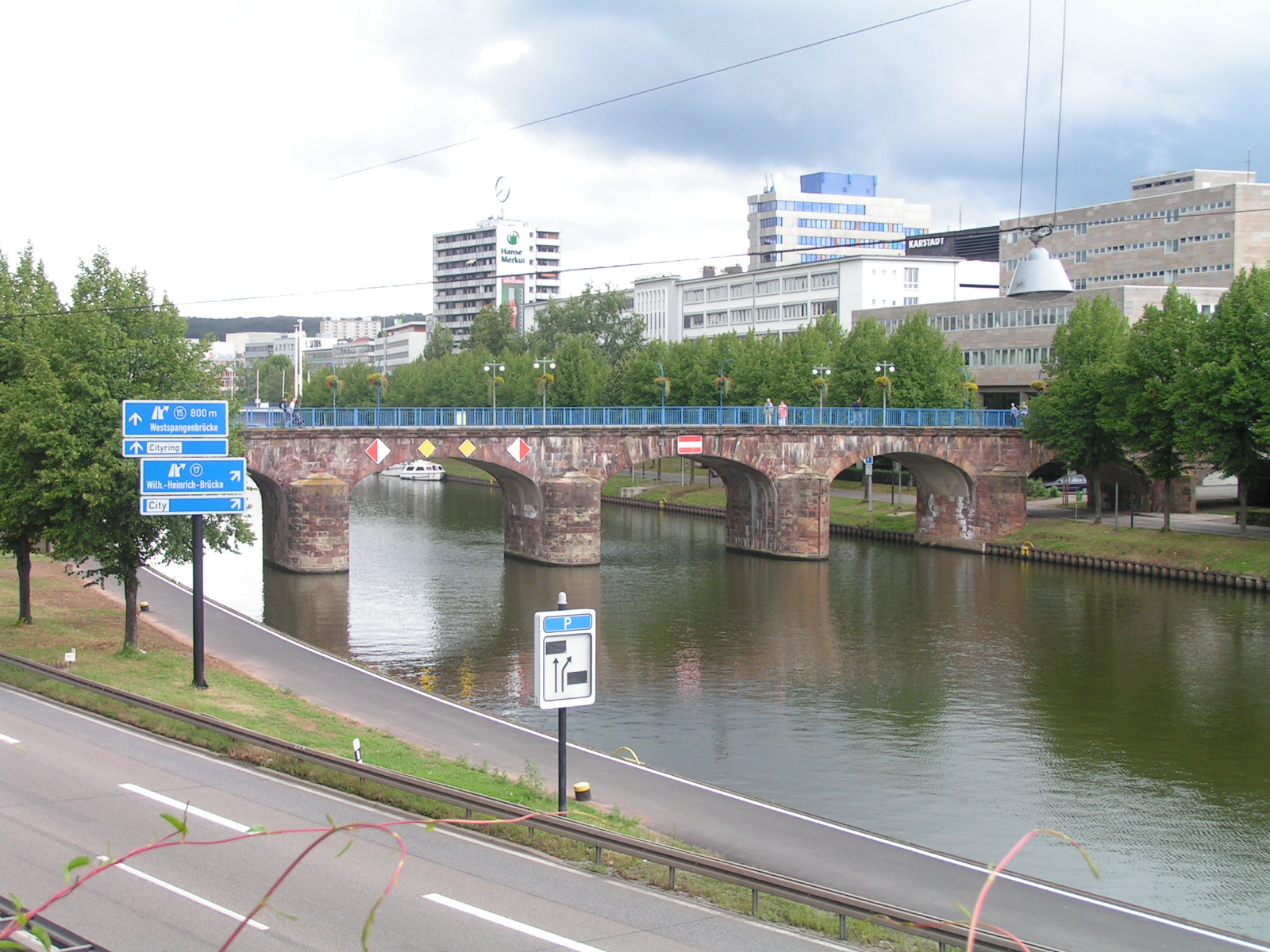
Alte Brücke (Old Bridge)

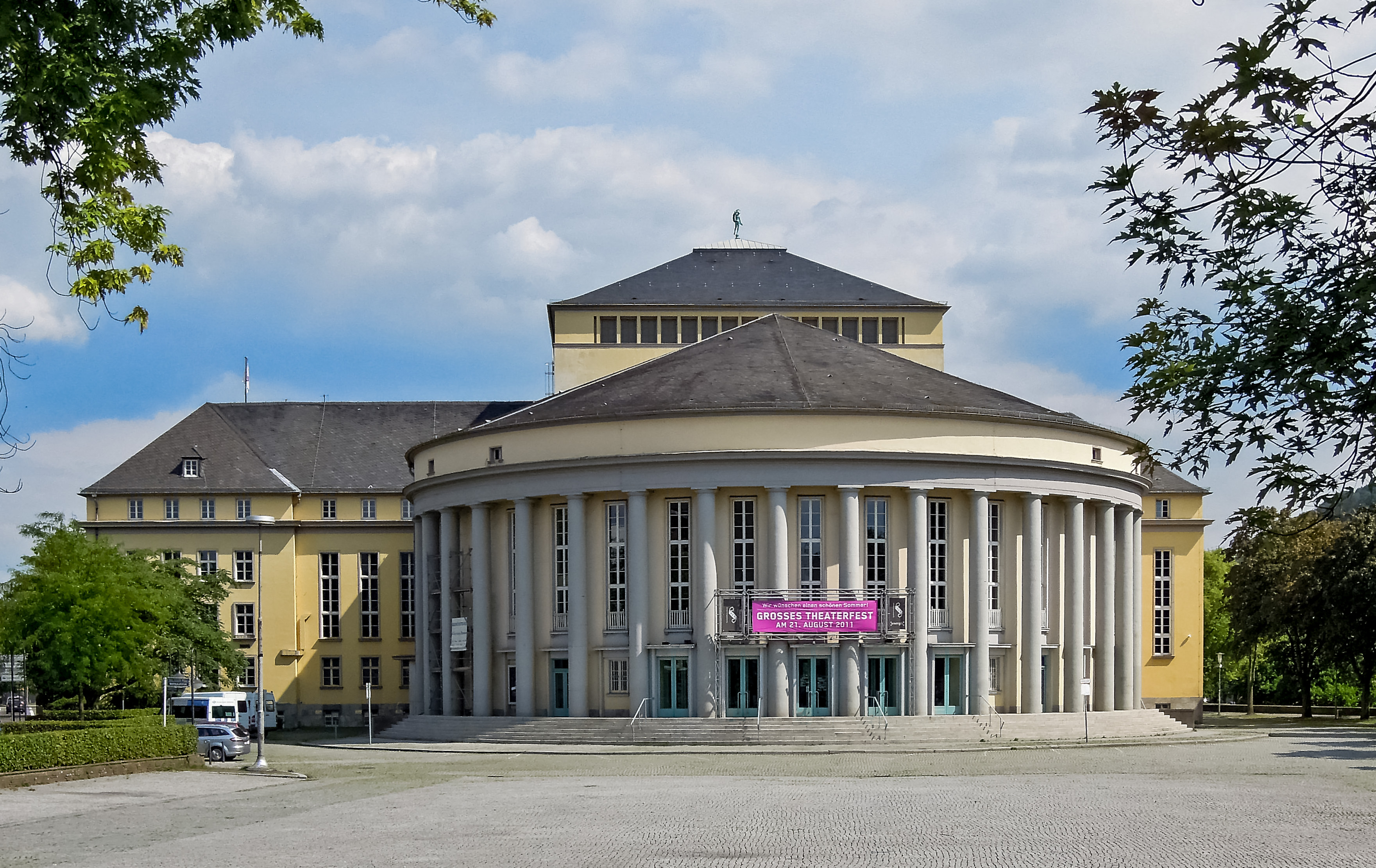
Staatstheater (State Theatre)

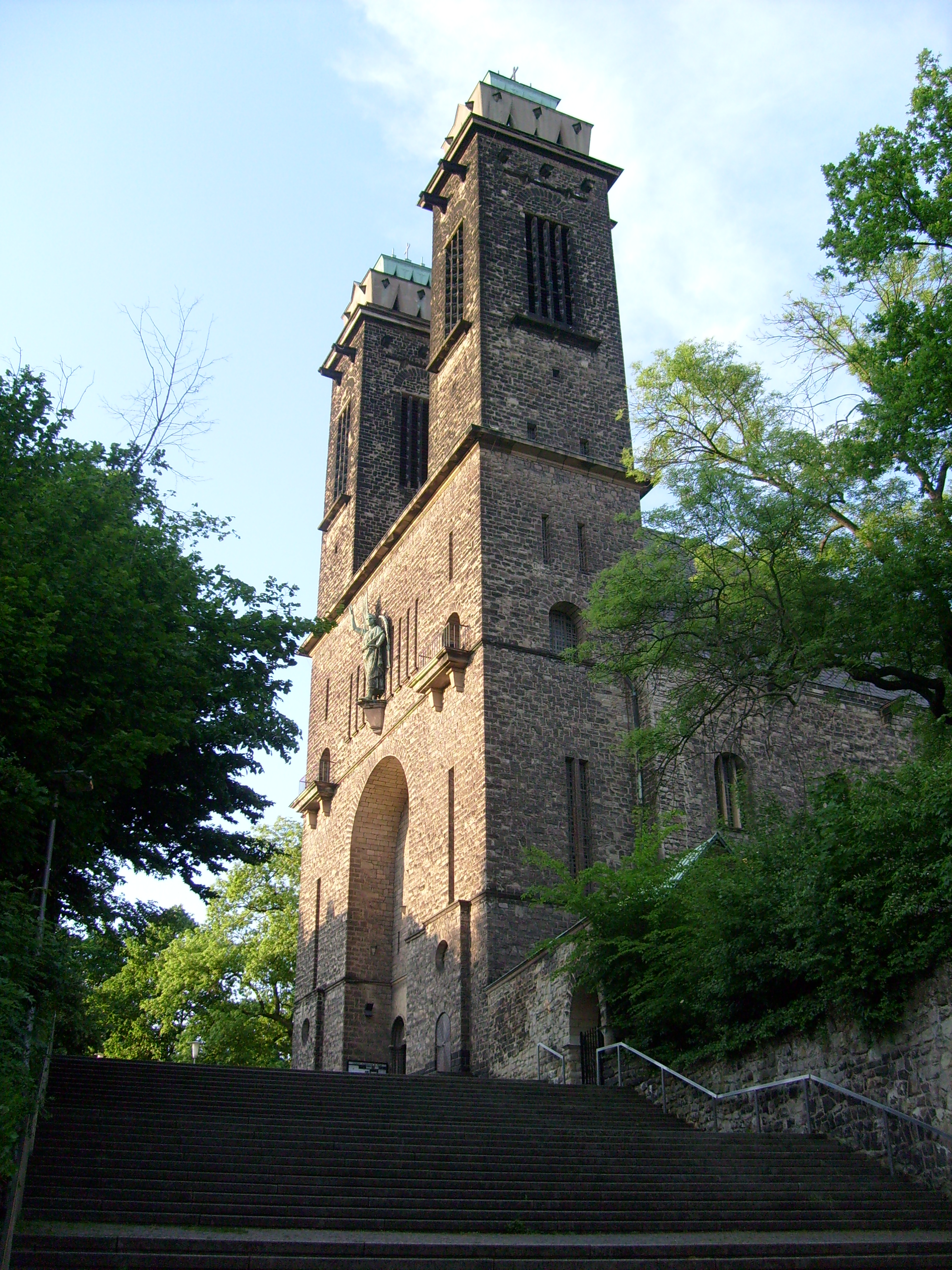
St Michael

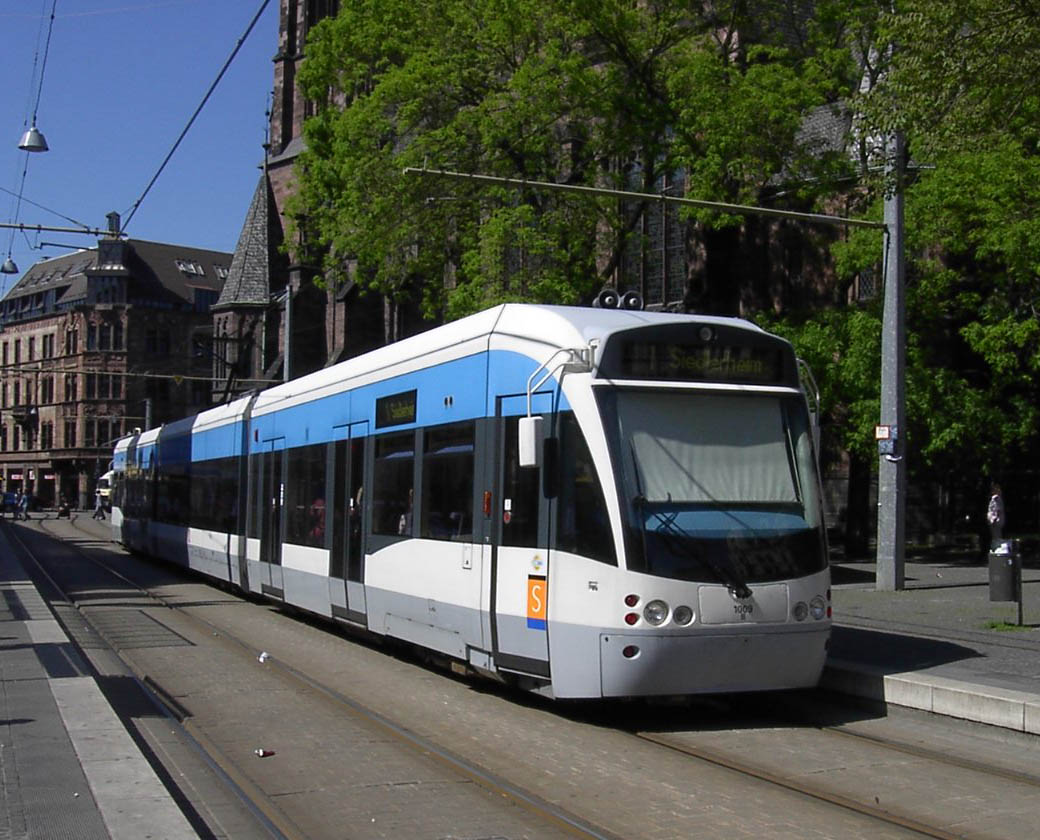
Saarbahn tramway

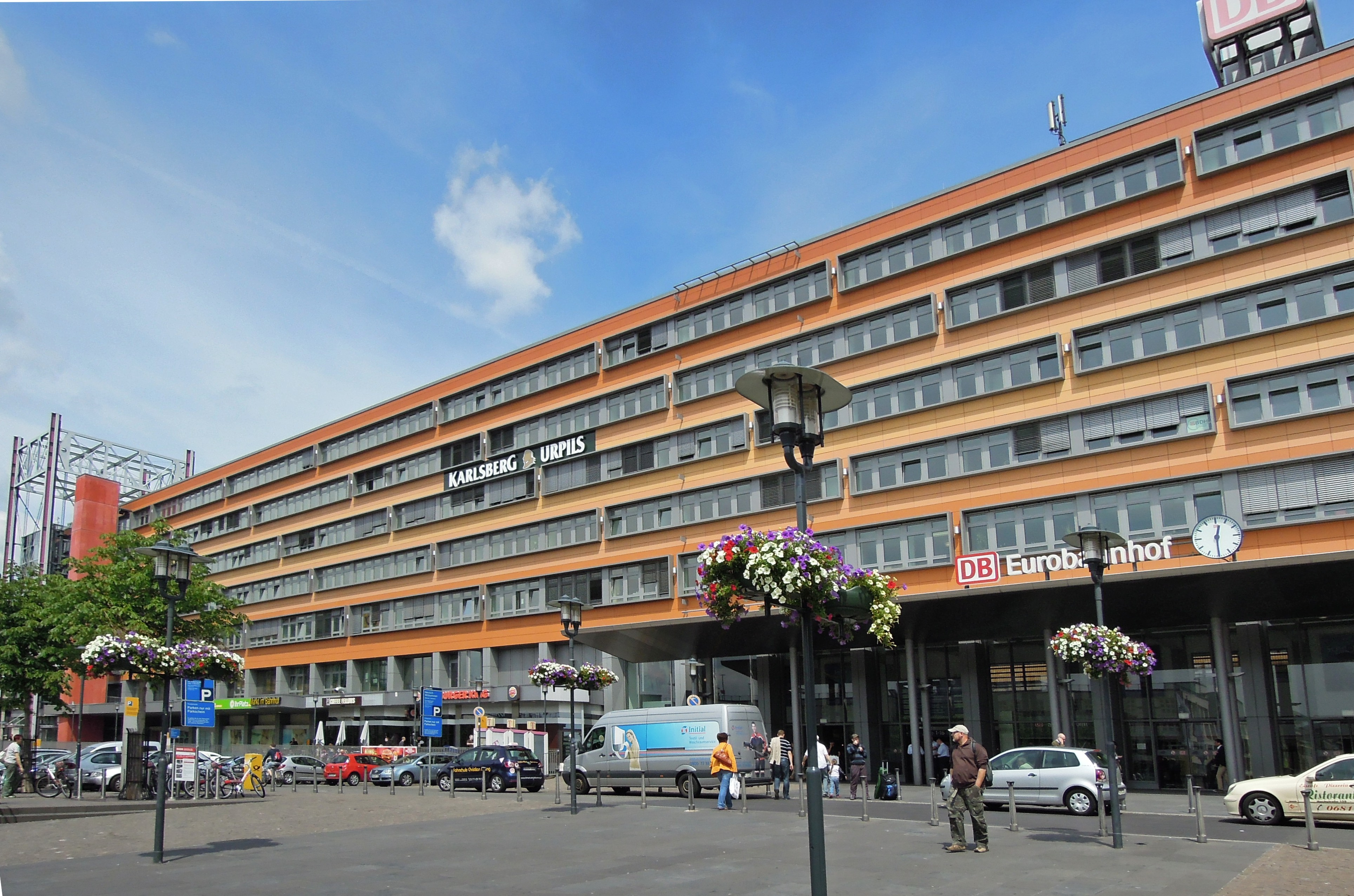
Central station

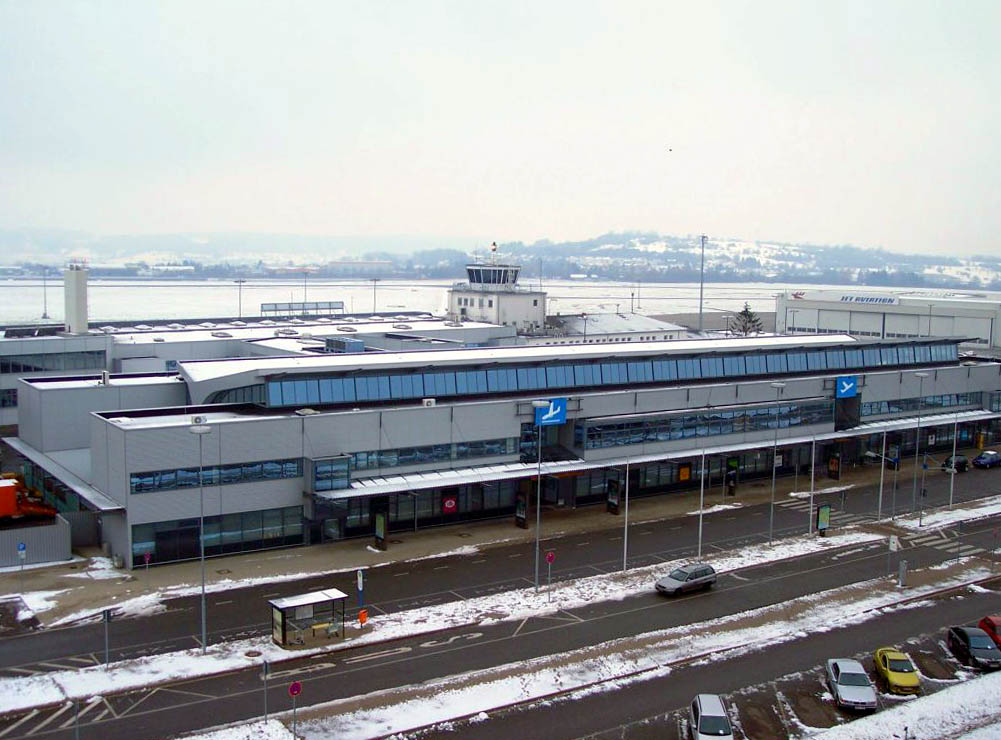
Saarbrücken Airport

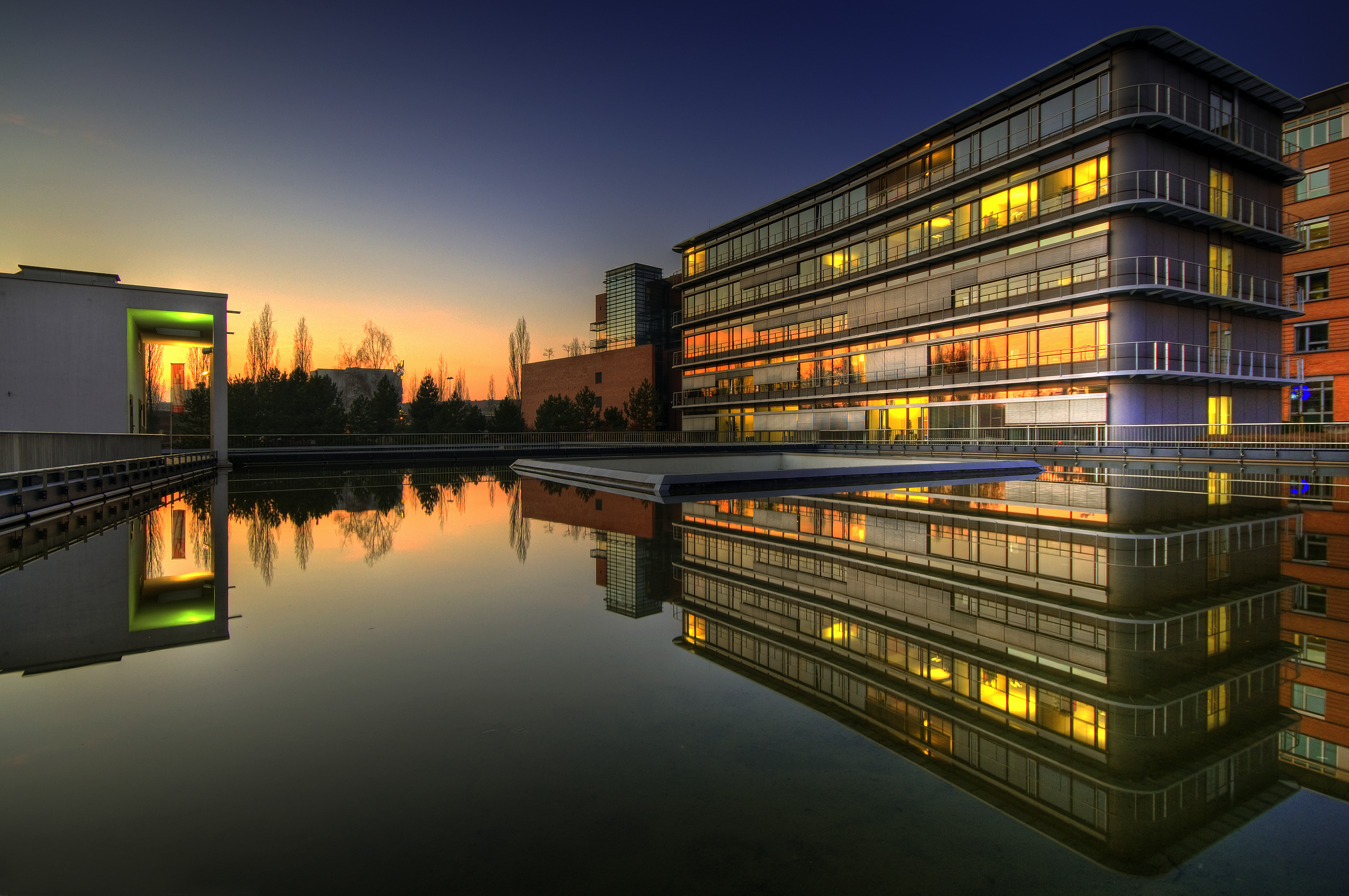
Harbour Road

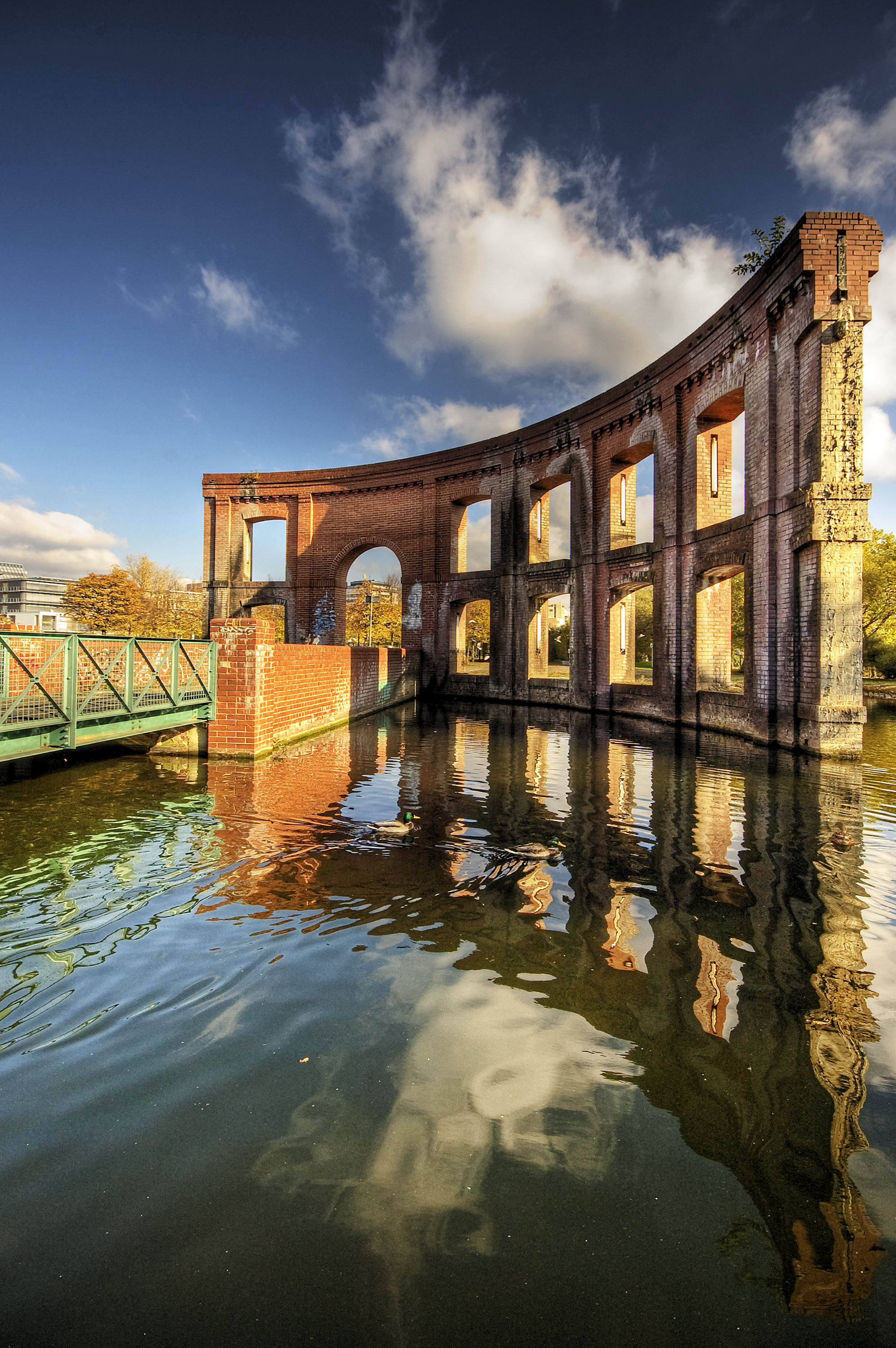
Bürgerpark

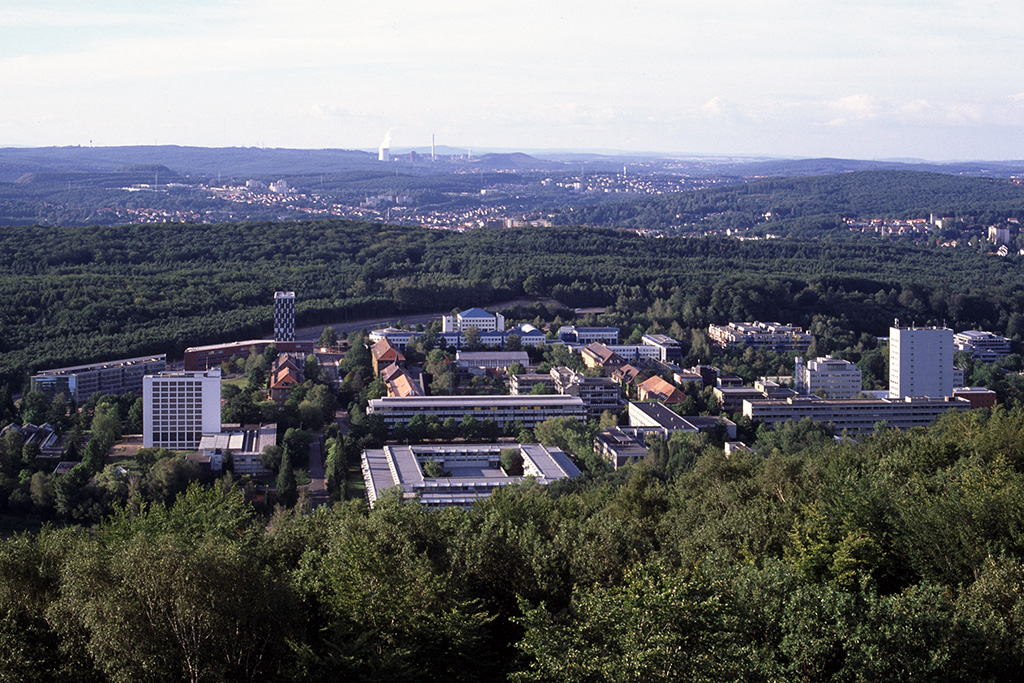
Campus of Saarland University

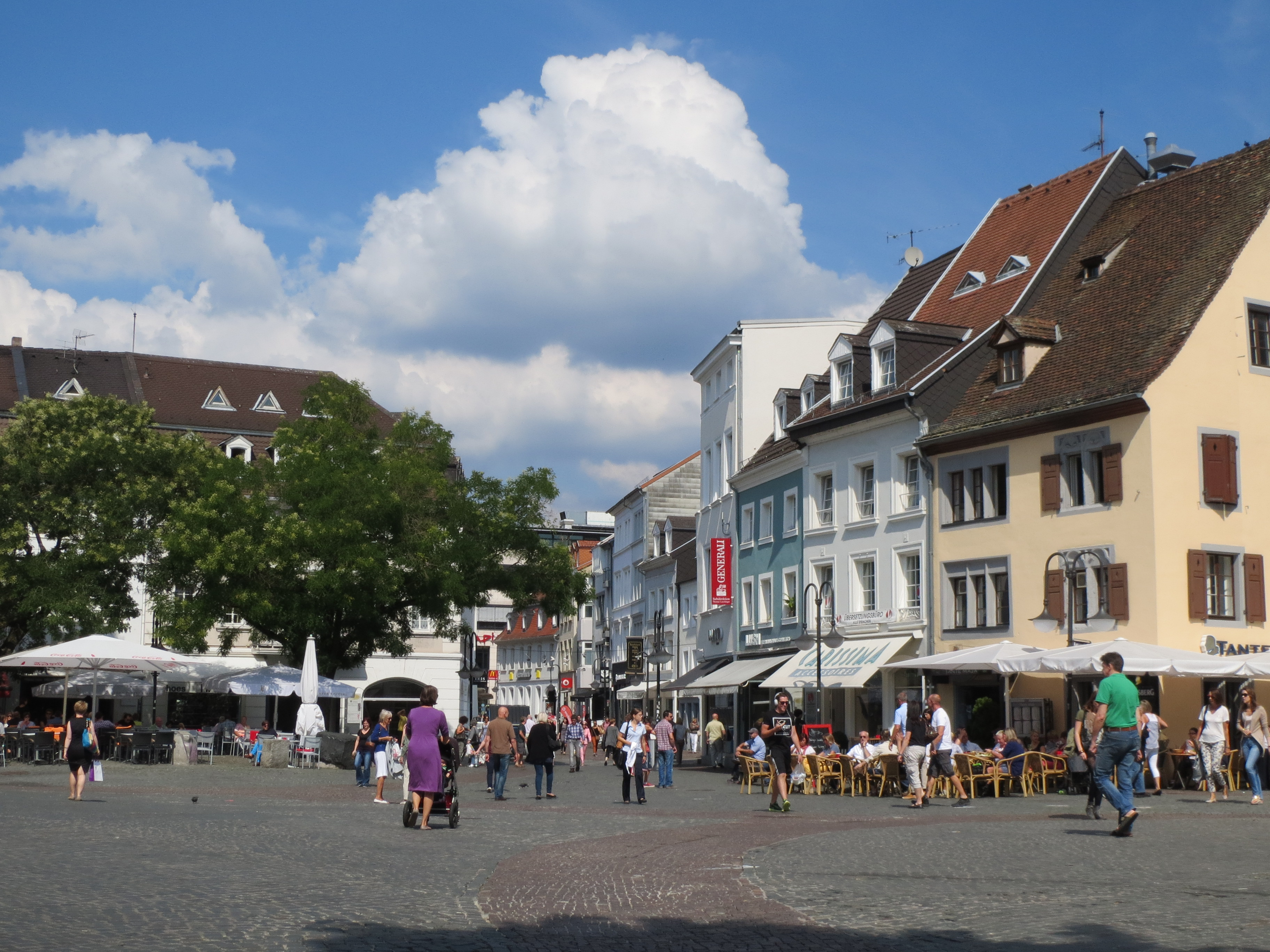
St Johanner Markt
