= Sankt Johann (Saarbrücken) =

City District of Saarbrücken

Coordinates: 49.232658°N 6.996285°E

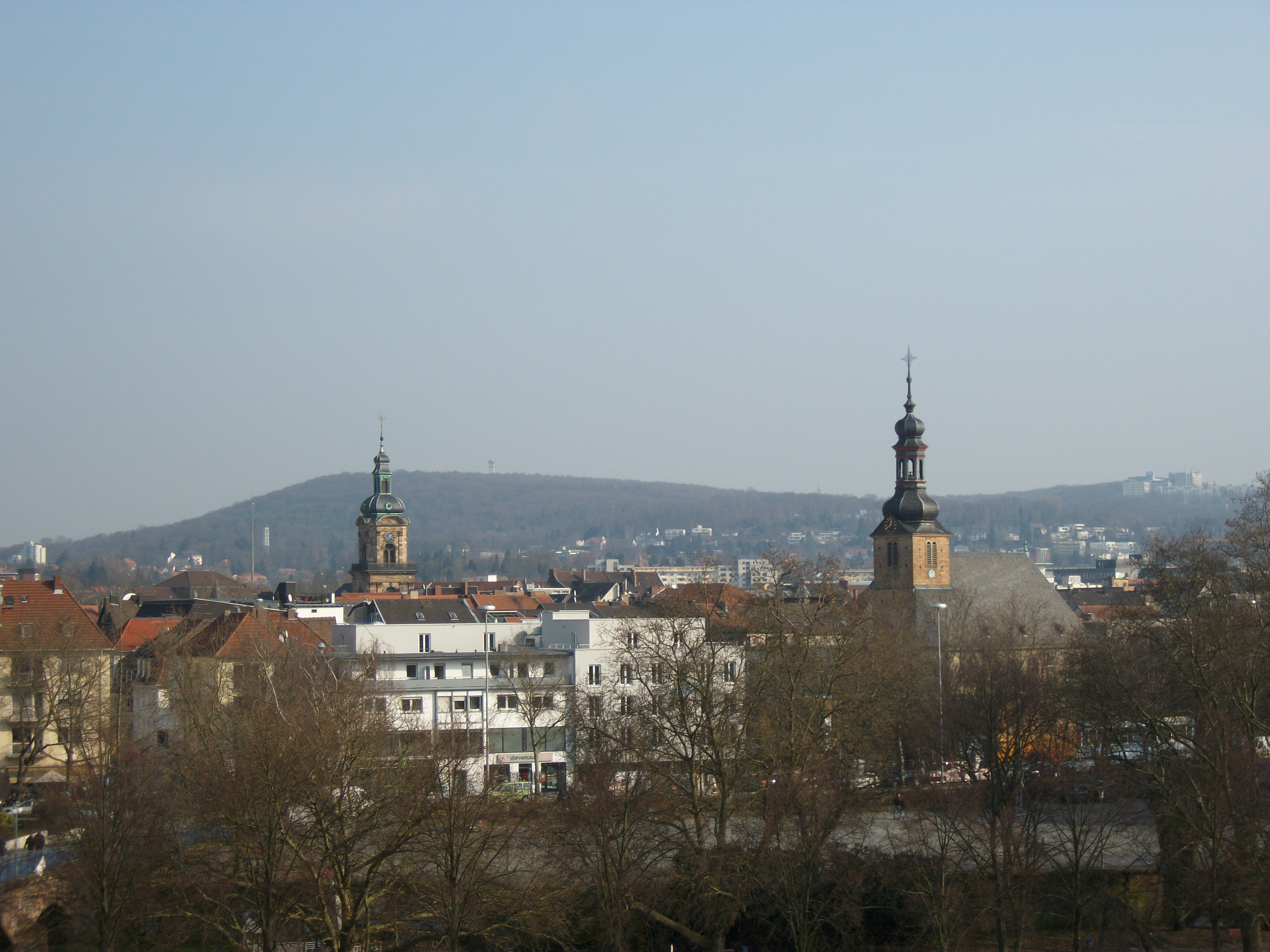

Sankt Johann (German pronunciation: [zaŋkt ˈjoːhan]) is part of the city of Saarbrücken in Saarland, Germany. It lies on the right bank of the Saar, opposite historic Saarbrücken, and is 79 kilometres (49 mi) northeast of Metz, France.

Sankt Johann got its name from a chapel erected there. From 1321 to 1859 it formed a single town with Saarbrücken, and then was united to form one municipality with Saarbrücken and Malstatt-Burbach. It joined with the former Saarbrücken, Burbach-Malstatt, and Sankt Arnual to form the present-day city of Saarbrücken in 1909.
