= Duke Georg August of Mecklenburg-Strelitz =

German royal (1824–1876)

Georg August
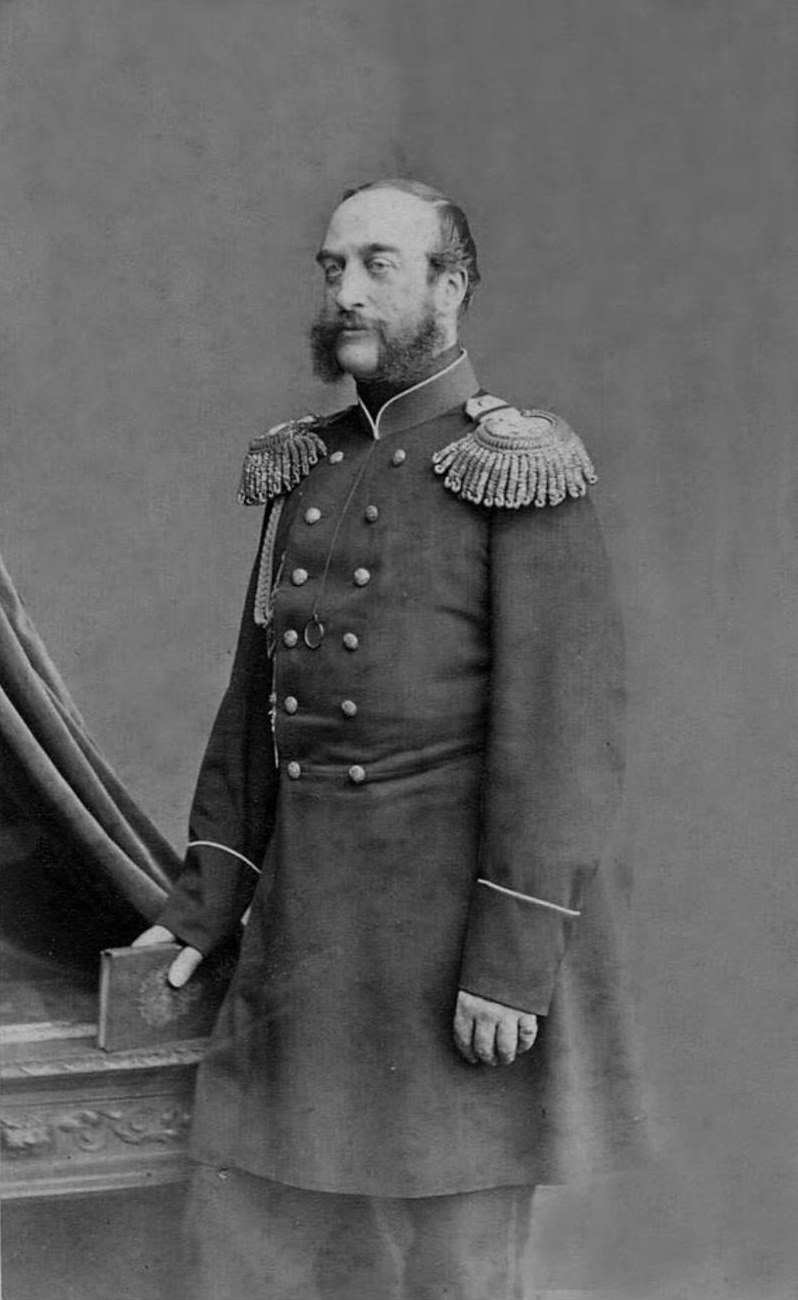
- Georg August c. 1870–76
- Born: 11 January 1824; Neustrelitz, Grand Duchy of Mecklenburg-Strelitz
- Died: 20 June 1876 (aged 52); St. Petersburg, Russian Empire
- Spouse: Grand Duchess Catherine Mikhailovna of Russia (m. 1851)
- Issue: Helene, Princess Albert of Saxe-Altenburg; Duke Georg Alexander; Charles Michael, Duke of Mecklenburg-Strelitz
Names
- German: Georg August Ernst Adolph Karl Ludwig
- House: House of Mecklenburg-Strelitz
- Father: George, Grand Duke of Mecklenburg-Strelitz
- Mother: Princess Marie of Hesse-Kassel

Georg August (11 January 1824 – 20 June 1876) was a member of the House of Mecklenburg-Strelitz.

== Life ==
He was born in Neustrelitz as second son of George, Grand Duke of Mecklenburg-Strelitz (1779-1860) and his wife Marie (1796-1880), daughter of Prince Frederick of Hesse-Kassel and Princess Caroline of Nassau-Usingen. His paternal grandparents were Charles II, Grand Duke of Mecklenburg-Strelitz and Princess Friederike of Hesse-Darmstadt.

His sister Caroline Mariane married Frederick VII of Denmark. On 1860 his elder brother Frederick William succeeded their father as Grand Duke of Mecklenburg-Strelitz.

George August died on 20 June 1876 in St. Petersburg, at the age of 52. The line of his son George soon died out; since his first son had married morganatically, his second son Charles Michael became titular grand duke of Mecklenburg-Strelitz.

== Marriage and children ==
On 16 February 1851 in St. Petersburg, George August married Grand Duchess Catherine Mikhailovna of Russia, daughter of Grand Duke Michael Pavlovich of Russia and had issue:

- Nikolaus (born and died 11 July 1854).
- Duchess Helene of Mecklenburg-Strelitz (16 January 1857 – 28 August 1936), married Prince Albert of Saxe-Altenburg.
- Duke Georg Alexander of Mecklenburg-Strelitz (6 June 1859 – 5 December 1909), he was Major General, Commander of the Life Guard Dragoon Regiment in the Russian army and a music lover, a skillful cellist and composer.
- Maria-Frederica (3 June 1861 - 16 December 1861).
- Charles Michael, Duke of Mecklenburg (17 June 1863 – 6 December 1934), titular grand duke of Mecklenburg-Strelitz.

== Honours and arms ==
Coats of arms of Mecklenburg-Strelitz

=== Orders and decorations ===
- Mecklenburg: Grand Cross of the House Order of the Wendish Crown, with Crown in Ore, 15 November 1864
- Kingdom of Hanover: Grand Cross of the Royal Guelphic Order, 1842
- Electorate of Hesse: Grand Cross of the House Order of the Golden Lion, 18 December 1844
- Russian Empire:
  - Knight of the Imperial Order of Saint Andrew the Apostle the First-called, July 1850; in Diamonds, February 1851
  - Knight of the Imperial Order of Saint Alexander Nevsky, July 1850
  - Knight of the Imperial Order of the White Eagle, July 1850
  - Knight of the Imperial Order of Saint Anna, 1st Class, July 1850
  - Knight of the Imperial Order of Saint Prince Vladimir, 2nd Class, August 1856; 1st Class, March 1866
- Kingdom of Prussia:
  - Knight of the Order of the Black Eagle, 15 August 1851
  - Knight of the Order of the Red Eagle, 1st Class
- Austrian Empire: Grand Cross of the Royal Hungarian Order of Saint Stephen, 1860
- Oldenburg: Grand Cross of the House and Merit Order of Duke Peter Friedrich Ludwig, with Golden Crown, 8 August 1860
- Nassau: Knight of the Order of the Gold Lion of the House of Nassau, May 1863
- Grand Duchy of Hesse: Grand Cross of the Grand Ducal Hessian Order of Ludwig, 11 September 1864
- Saxe-Weimar-Eisenach: Grand Cross of the Order of the White Falcon, 1 June 1868
- Denmark: Knight of the Order of the Elephant, 1 September 1868
- Württemberg: Grand Cross of the Order of the Württemberg Crown, 1872

== Ancestry ==
Ancestors of Duke Georg August of Mecklenburg-Strelitz

8. Duke Charles Louis Frederick of Mecklenburg-Strelitz
4. Charles II, Grand Duke of Mecklenburg-Strelitz
9. Princess Elisabeth Albertine of Saxe-Hildburghausen
2. George, Grand Duke of Mecklenburg-Strelitz
10. Prince George William of Hesse-Darmstadt
5. Princess Friederike of Hesse-Darmstadt
11. Countess Maria Louise Albertine of Leiningen-Dagsburg-Falkenburg
1. Duke Georg August of Mecklenburg-Strelitz
12. Frederick II, Landgrave of Hesse-Kassel
6. Prince Frederick of Hesse-Kassel
13. Princess Mary of Great Britain
3. Princess Marie of Hesse-Kassel
14. Charles William, Prince of Nassau-Usingen
7. Princess Caroline of Nassau-Usingen
15. Countess Caroline Felizitas of Leiningen-Dagsburg-Falkenburg

== Sources ==
- Erstling, Frank; Frank Saß; Eberhard Schulze; Harald Witzke (April 2001). "Das Fürstenhaus von Mecklenburg-Strelitz". Mecklenburg-Strelitz, Beiträge zur Geschichte einer Region (in German). Friedland: Steffen. ISBN 3-9807532-0-4.
- Huberty, Michel; Alain Giraud; F. et B. Magdelaine. L'Allemagne Dynastique, Tome VI : Bade-Mecklembourg. ISBN 978-2-901138-06-8.

== Literature ==
- Mecklenburg-Strelitz – Beiträge zur Geschichte einer Region. Friedland i. Meckl.: Steffen, ^{2}2001 ISBN 3-9807532-0-4
- Grewolls, Grete (2011). Wer war wer in Mecklenburg und Vorpommern. Das Personenlexikon (in German). Rostock: Hinstorff Verlag. p. 4830. ISBN 978-3-356-01301-6.

== Bibliography ==
- Katin-Yartsev, M and Shumkov, A. Costume Ball at the Winter Palace. Russky Antiquariat, 2003, ISBN 5981290021
