= Duchess Helene of Mecklenburg-Strelitz =

Helene of Mecklenburg-Strelitz
- Princess Albert of Saxe-Altenburg
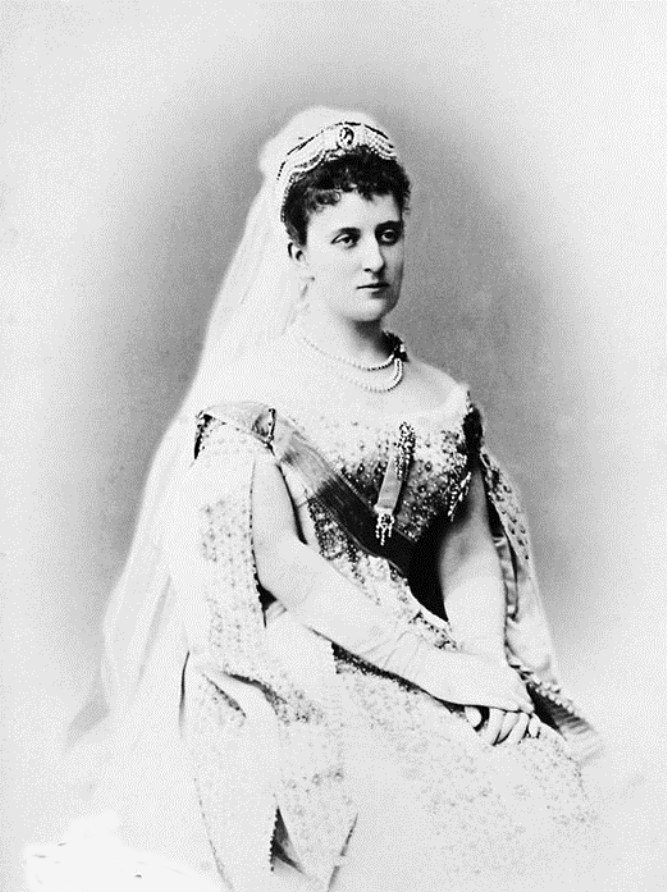
- Photograph, 1886
- Born: 16 January 1857; St Petersburg, Russian Empire
- Died: 28 August 1936 (aged 79); Remplin, Mecklenburg, Nazi Germany
- Burial: Friedhof, Remplin, Mecklenburg, Germany
- Spouse: Prince Albert of Saxe-Altenburg (m. 1891; died 1902)
Names
- Helene Marie Alexandra Elisabeth Auguste Katherine
- House: Mecklenburg-Strelitz
- Father: Duke Georg of Mecklenburg-Strelitz
- Mother: Grand Duchess Catherine Mikhailovna of Russia

Duchess Helene of Mecklenburg-Strelitz (16 January 1857 – 28 August 1936) was a daughter of Duke Georg August of Mecklenburg-Strelitz and his wife, Grand Duchess Catherine Mikhailovna of Russia. She was the second wife of Prince Albert of Saxe-Altenburg.

== Early life and marriage ==
As the only daughter of Grand Duchess Catherine (herself the principal heiress to her father Grand Duke Michael), Helene was quite notably wealthy. She belonged to the Russian branch of the House of Mecklenburg-Strelitz and as such, had many ties to her mother's native country.

The Princess of Battenberg was eager for Helene to marry her son Alexander, the reigning Prince of Bulgaria, but he was uninterested in her. There were also negotiations regarding a marriage between Helena and Milan I of Serbia, intended by his regents to strengthen his ties with Russia; however, in the end, nothing came of it.

On 13 December 1891 at Remplin, Helene married Prince Albert of Saxe-Altenburg. He was the only son of Prince Eduard of Saxe-Altenburg by his second wife, Princess Luise Caroline Reuss of Greiz (1822-1875), and had been previously married to Princess Marie of Prussia until her death in 1888. Through marriage, Helene became step mother to Albert's two daughters, Olga and Marie. Together, they all lived at the Kamenny Island Palace, which she inherited from her mother. Her own marriage to Albert was childless.

== Later years ==
After their wedding, Helene and Albert spent half of the year in Russia, where he was much missed in Berlin society. In 1896, Albert and several other prominent social leaders left Berlin as a result of differences they held with Emperor Wilhelm II. He and his family retired to their Schwerin estate. Sources reported that Wilhelm's "arbitrary manners" became so intolerable to Albert and others, as they were used to the days of social courtesy under the old Wilhelm I.

Albert died on 22 May 1902. Helene remained in Russia until the Bolsheviks' success in the Russian Civil War forced her and her family to flee abroad in 1919. She lived in Copenhagen, Denmark from 1919 to 1923 and in Hellerup, Denmark from 1923 to at least November 1925.

After the death of Dowager Empress Maria Feodorovna in 1928, Princess Helena settled in Paris, where she became professor of music at the Conservatoire Rachmaninoff and chair of the newly founded Russian Musical Society Abroad. She eventually took up residence at Schloss Remplin in Mecklenburg with her nephew George, Duke of Mecklenburg and his family. They were joined in 1930 by her brother Charles Michael, Duke of Mecklenburg, who owned the property.

== Death ==
It was at Remplin that Duchess Helene died on 28 August 1936, aged 79. Her body was interred at Friedhof Remplin in Mecklenburg, Germany.

== Ancestry ==
Ancestors of Duchess Helene of Mecklenburg-Strelitz

8. Charles II, Grand Duke of Mecklenburg
4. George, Grand Duke of Mecklenburg
9. Princess Friederike of Hesse-Darmstadt
2. Duke Georg August of Mecklenburg-Strelitz
10. Landgrave Frederick of Hesse-Kassel
5. Princess Marie of Hesse-Kassel
11. Princess Caroline of Nassau-Usingen
1. Duchess Helene of Mecklenburg-Strelitz
12. Paul I of Russia
6. Grand Duke Michael Pavlovich of Russia
13. Duchess Sophie Dorothea of Württemberg
3. Grand Duchess Catherine Mikhailovna of Russia
14. Prince Paul of Württemberg
7. Princess Charlotte of Württemberg
15. Princess Charlotte of Saxe-Hildburghausen
