= Duchess Caroline Mariane of Mecklenburg =

Crown Princess of Denmark (1821–1876)

Caroline of Mecklenburg-Strelitz
- Crown Princess of Denmark
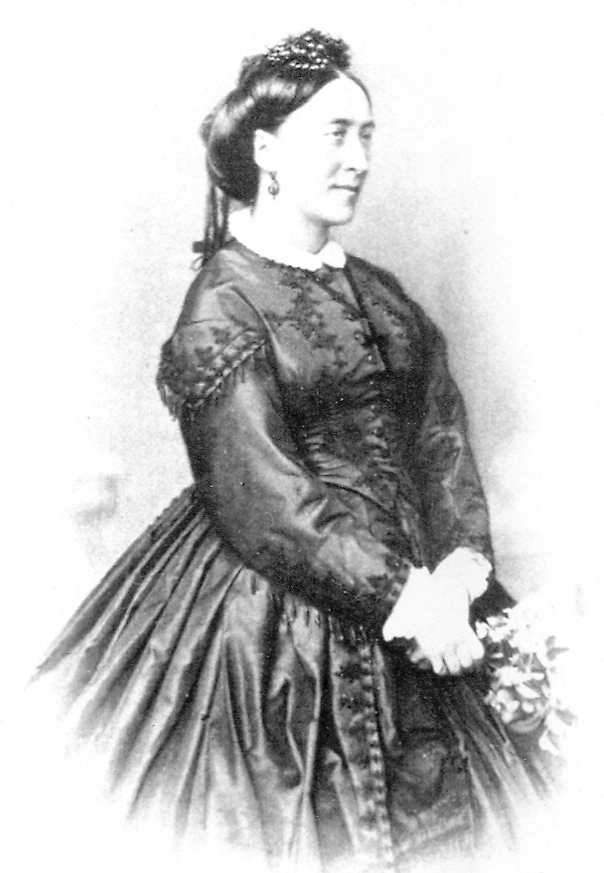
- Born: 10 January 1821; Neustrelitz
- Died: 1 June 1876 (aged 55); Neustrelitz
- Spouse: Frederick, Crown Prince of Denmark (later Frederick VII) (m. 1841; div. 1846)
Names
- Caroline Charlotte Marianne
- House: House of Mecklenburg-Strelitz (by birth); House of Oldenburg (by marriage)
- Father: George, Grand Duke of Mecklenburg
- Mother: Princess Marie of Hesse-Kassel

Duchess Caroline Marianne of Mecklenburg-Strelitz (10 January 1821 – 1 June 1876) was a member of the House of Mecklenburg-Strelitz who became Crown Princess of Denmark as the second spouse of the future king Frederick VII of Denmark.

== Biography ==
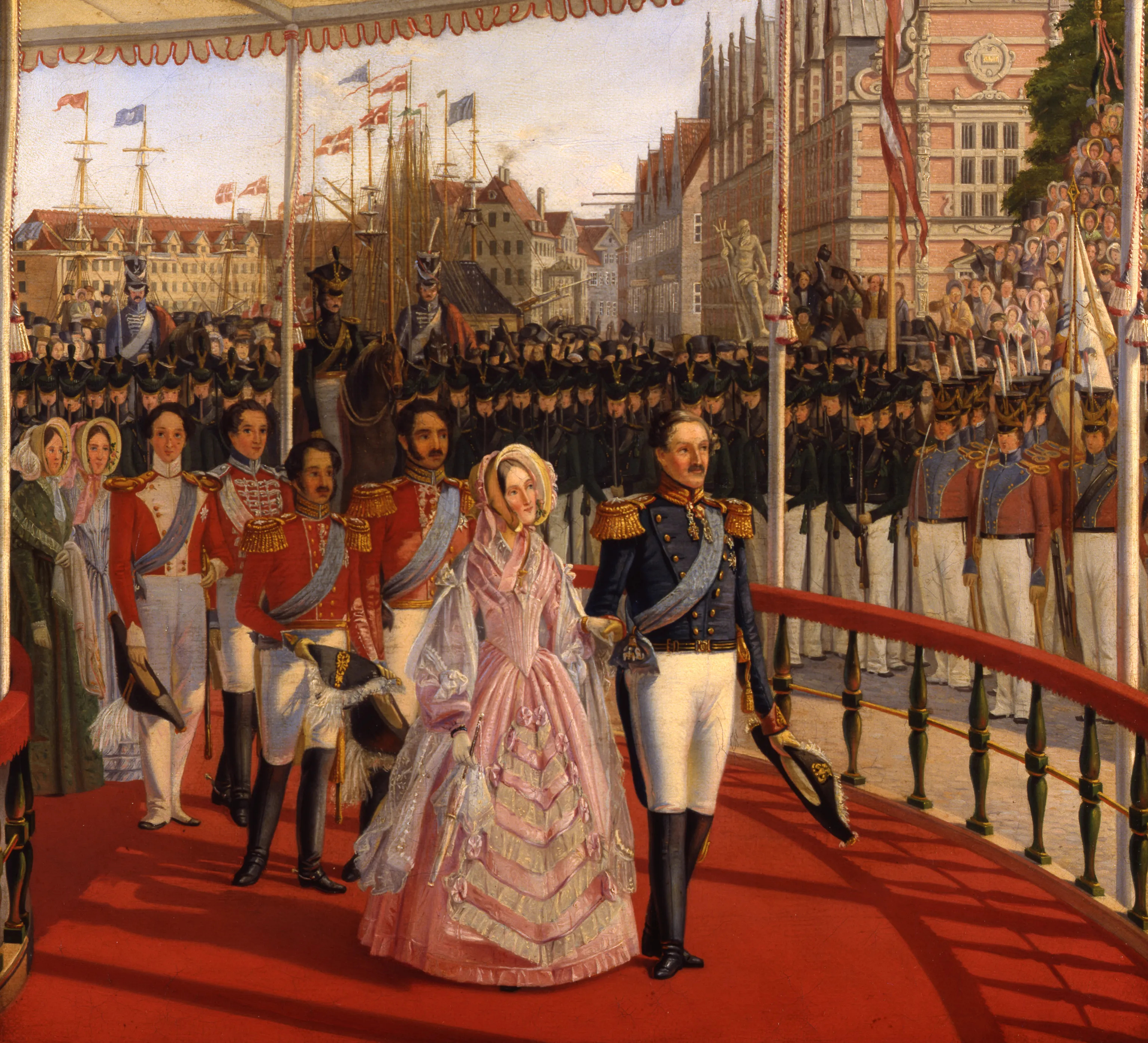
The arrival of Duchess Marianne in Copenhagen in 1841, with her fiance Crown Prince Frederick

Duchess Caroline Charlotte Marianne of Mecklenburg-Strelitz, was born in Neustrelitz, the daughter of George, Grand Duke of Mecklenburg-Strelitz, and his consort, Princess Marie of Hesse-Kassel. She was married to His Royal Highness Crown Prince Frederick, heir apparent to the Danish throne, in Neustrelitz on 10 June 1841. In Denmark, she was always known as Princess Mariane.

Very early on, the marriage proved to be a very unhappy one, due in large part to The Crown Prince's bad temperament, excessive drinking and shameless womanizing. Princess Caroline Marianne, who was described as incurably shy and nervous, lacked the ability to serve as a calming influence over her consort. After a visit to her parents in Germany in 1844, Caroline Marianne refused to return to Denmark. The divorce was completed in 1846. Following the divorce, Caroline Marianne, who retained her title, lived a quiet life in Neustrelitz.

== Death ==
She died quietly in Neustrelitz on 1 June 1876 and was buried in Johanniterkirche, Mirow.

== Ancestry ==
Ancestors of Duchess Caroline Mariane of Mecklenburg

8. Duke Charles Louis Frederick of Mecklenburg
4. Charles II, Grand Duke of Mecklenburg-Strelitz
9. Princess Elisabeth Albertine of Saxe-Hildburghausen
2. George, Grand Duke of Mecklenburg-Strelitz
10. Prince George William of Hesse-Darmstadt
5. Princess Friederike of Hesse-Darmstadt
11. Countess Maria Louise Albertine of Leiningen-Falkenburg-Dagsburg
1. Caroline Mariane of Mecklenburg-Strelitz
12. Frederick II, Landgrave of Hesse-Kassel
6. Prince Frederick of Hesse-Kassel
13. Princess Mary of Great Britain
3. Princess Marie of Hesse-Kassel
14. Charles William, Prince of Nassau-Usingen
7. Princess Caroline of Nassau-Usingen
15. Countess Caroline Felizitas of Leiningen-Dagsburg
