= Princess Augusta of Hesse-Kassel =

Duchess of Cambridge (1797–1889)

Augusta of Hesse-Kassel
- Duchess of Cambridge
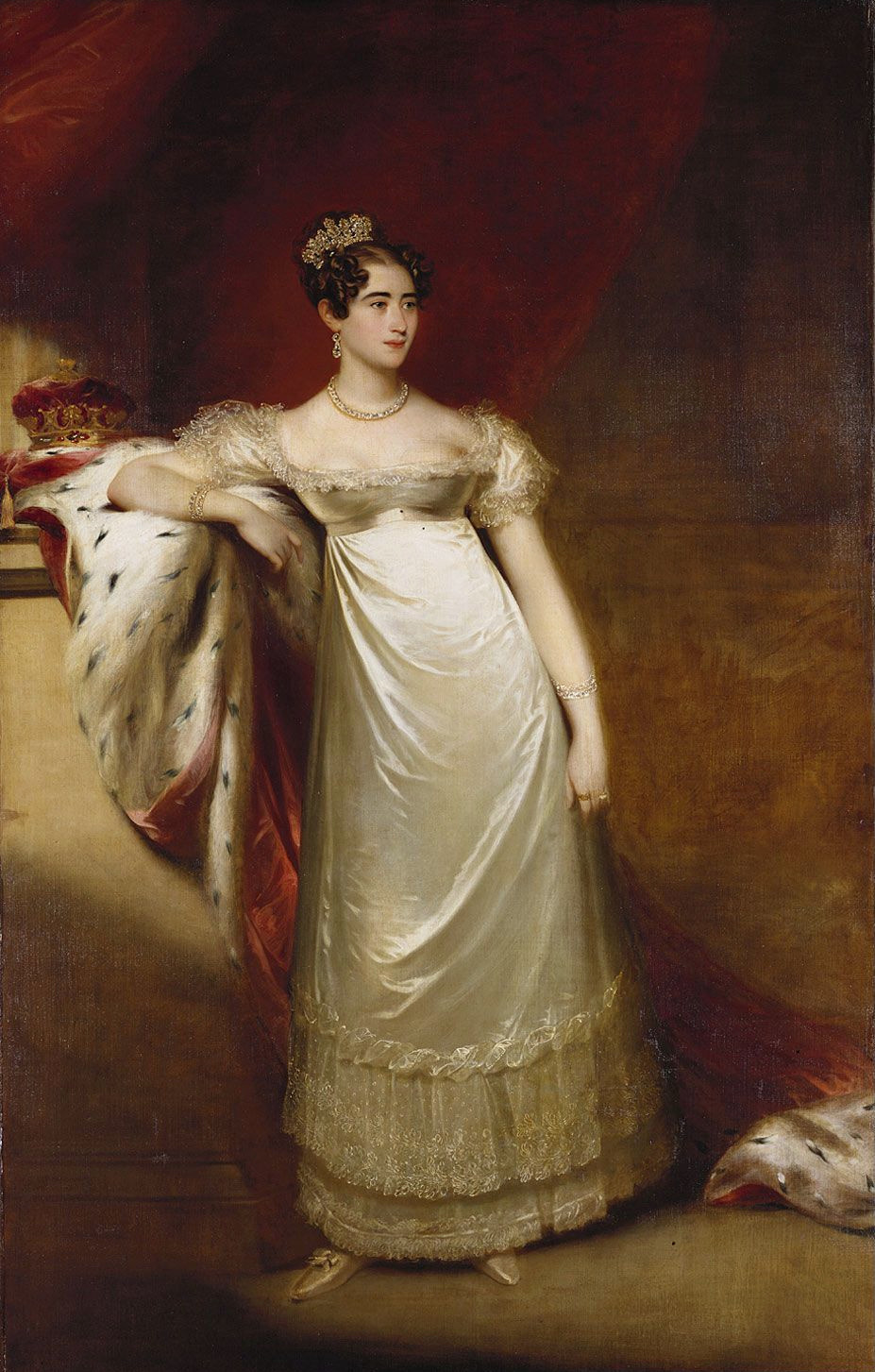
- Portrait by William Beechey, 1818

Viceregal consort of the Kingdom of Hanover
- Tenure: 7 May 1818 – 20 June 1837
- Viceroy: Prince Adolphus
- Born: 25 July 1797; Rumpenheim Castle, Offenbach am Main
- Died: 6 April 1889 (aged 91); St James's Palace, Pall Mall, London
- Burial: 13 April 1889; St Anne's Church, Kew, Surrey; 10 January 1930; Royal Vault, St George's Chapel, Windsor Castle
- Spouse: Prince Adolphus, Duke of Cambridge (m. 1818; died 1850)
- Issue: Prince George, Duke of Cambridge; Augusta, Grand Duchess of Mecklenburg-Strelitz; Princess Mary Adelaide, Duchess of Teck
Names
- Augusta Wilhelmina Louisa
- House: Hesse-Kassel
- Father: Prince Frederick of Hesse-Kassel
- Mother: Princess Caroline of Nassau-Usingen

Princess Augusta of Hesse-Kassel (Augusta Wilhelmina Louisa; 25 July 1797 – 6 April 1889) was the wife of Prince Adolphus, Duke of Cambridge, the tenth-born child and seventh son of George III of the United Kingdom and Charlotte of Mecklenburg-Strelitz. The longest-lived daughter-in-law of George III, she was the maternal grandmother of Mary of Teck, wife of George V.

== Early life ==
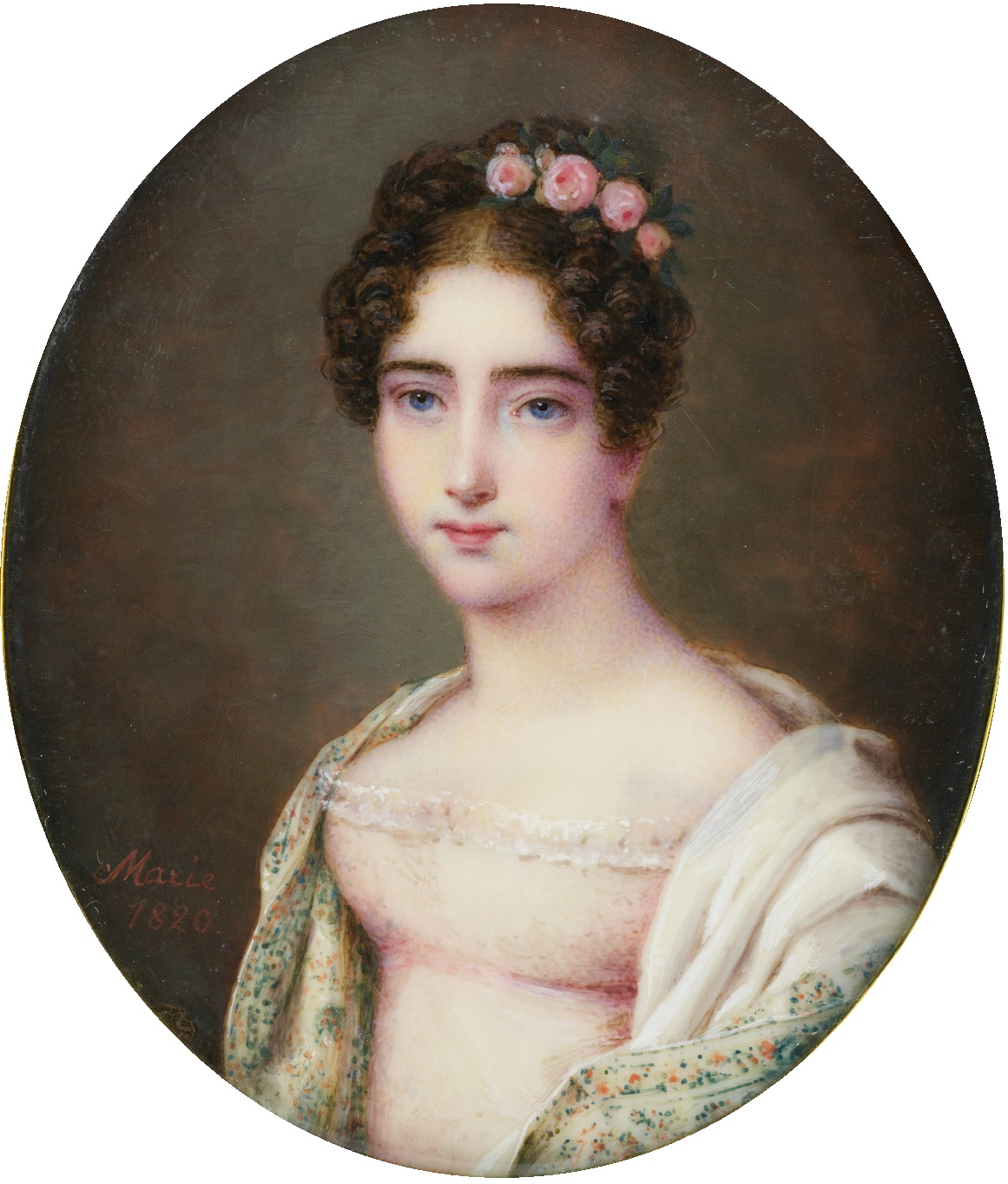
Augusta painted by her sister Marie in 1820

Princess and Landgravine Augusta of Hesse-Kassel, third daughter of Prince Frederick of Hesse-Kassel, and his wife, Princess Caroline of Nassau-Usingen, was born at Rumpenheim Castle (French: Château de Rumpenheim, German: Rumpenheimer Schloss), Offenbach am Main, Hesse. Through her father, she was a great-granddaughter of George II of Great Britain, her grandmother being George II's daughter Mary. Her father's older brother was the Landgrave of Hesse-Kassel. In 1803, her uncle's title was raised to Elector of Hesse—whereby the entire Kassel branch of the Hesse dynasty gained an upward notch in hierarchy.

== Marriage ==
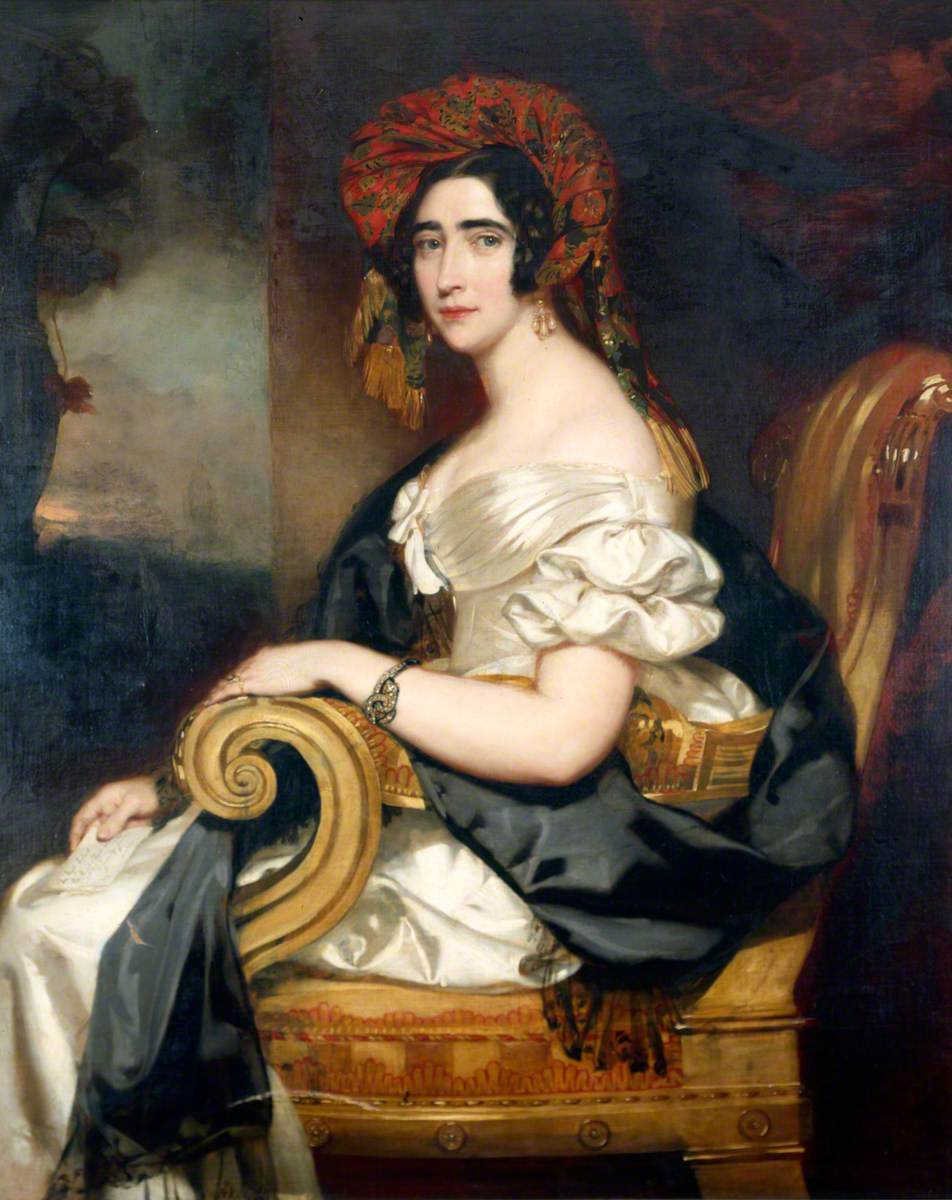
Portrait by John Lucas, c. early 1830s

On 7 May, in Kassel, and then, again, on 1 June 1818 at Buckingham Palace, Princess Augusta married her second cousin, the Duke of Cambridge, when she was 20 and he 44. Upon their marriage, Augusta became Duchess of Cambridge. They had three children.

From 1818 until the accession of Queen Victoria, and the separation of the British and Hanoverian crowns in 1837, the Duchess of Cambridge lived in Hanover, where the Duke served as viceroy on behalf of his brothers, George IV and William IV. Hanover had been liberated from French occupation in 1813 and the dynastic union with Britain restored.

In 1827 Augusta allowed that a new village, founded on 3 May 1827 and to be settled in the course of the cultivation and colonisation of the moorlands in the south of Bremervörde, would bear her name. On 19 June the administration of the Hanoveran High-Bailiwick of Stade informed the villagers that she had approved the chosen name Augustendorf for their municipality (since 1974 it is a component locality of Gnarrenburg). The Duke and Duchess of Cambridge returned to Great Britain, where they lived at Cambridge Cottage, Kew, and later at St James's Palace.

== Death ==
The Duchess of Cambridge survived her husband by thirty-nine years, dying on 6 April 1889, at the age of ninety-one, at their home at Cambridge Cottage on Kew Green. Queen Victoria wrote of her aunt's death: "Very sad, though not for her. But she is the last of her generation, & I have no longer anyone above me."

She was buried at St Anne's Church, Kew, but her remains were transferred to St George's Chapel, Windsor Castle in 1930.

== Titles and styles ==
- 25 July 1797 – 7 May 1818: Her Serene Highness Princess Augusta Wilhelmina Louisa of Hesse
- 7 May 1818 – 6 April 1889: Her Royal Highness The Duchess of Cambridge

== Issue ==
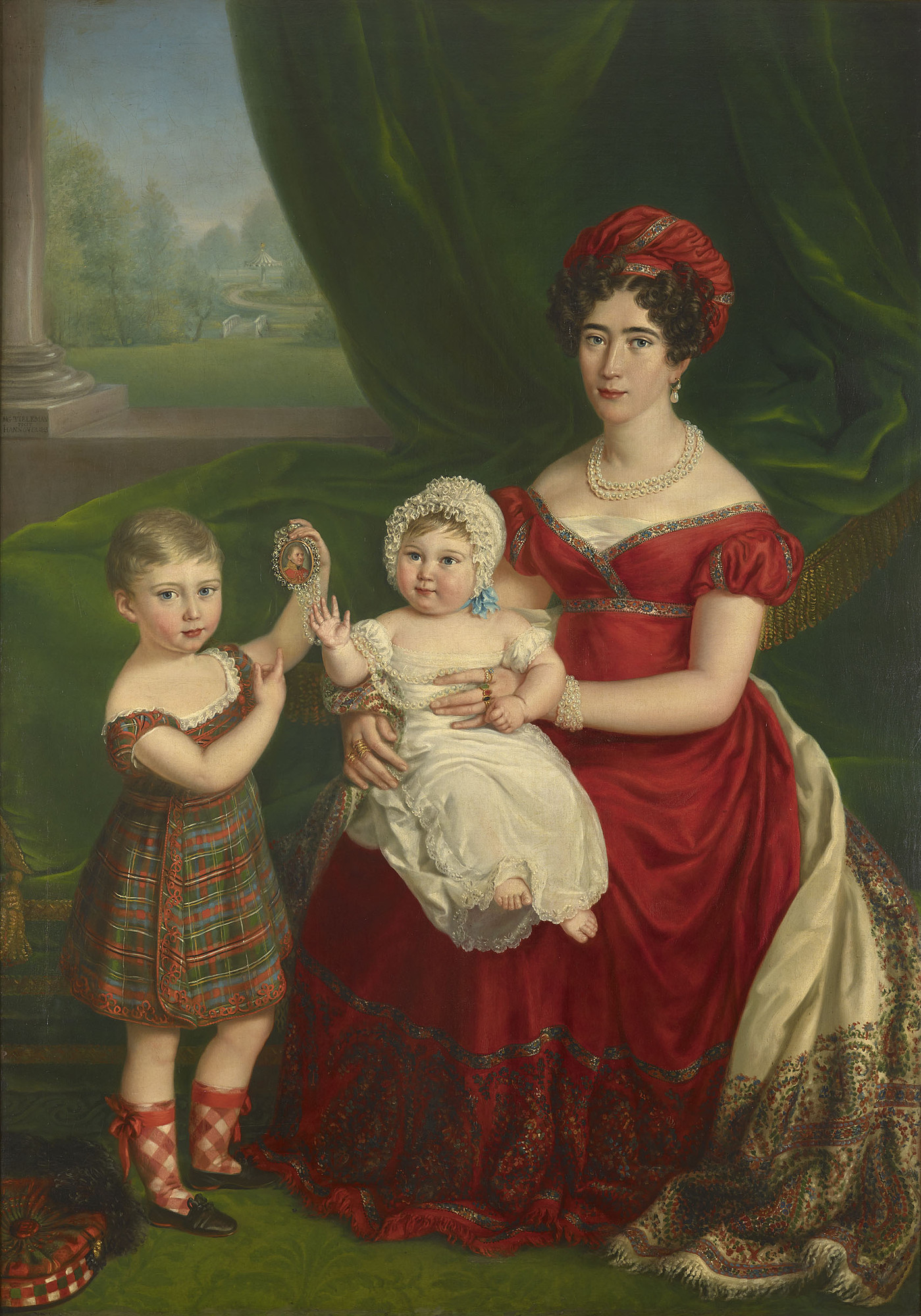
Duchess Augusta with children Prince George and Princess Augusta by Melchior Gommar Tieleman, 1823

The Duke and Duchess of Cambridge had three children:

Name	Birth	Death	Notes
Prince George, Duke of Cambridge	26 March 1819	17 March 1904	married 1847, Sarah Louisa Fairbrother; had issue (this marriage was contracted in contravention of the Royal Marriages Act and was not recognised in law).
Princess Augusta of Cambridge	19 July 1822	4 December 1916	married 1843, Friedrich Wilhelm, Grand Duke of Mecklenburg-Strelitz; had issue
Princess Mary Adelaide of Cambridge	27 November 1833	27 October 1897	married 1866, Francis, Duke of Teck; had issue, including Mary of Teck, later Queen consort of the United Kingdom.

== Ancestry ==
Ancestors of Princess Augusta of Hesse-Kassel

8. William VIII, Landgrave of Hesse-Kassel
4. Frederick II, Landgrave of Hesse-Kassel
9. Princess Dorothea Wilhelmine of Saxe-Zeitz
2. Prince Frederick of Hesse-Kassel
10. George II of Great Britain
5. Princess Mary of Great Britain
11. Princess Caroline of Brandenburg-Ansbach
1. Princess Augusta of Hesse-Kassel
12. Charles, Prince of Nassau-Usingen
6. Charles William, Prince of Nassau-Usingen
13. Princess Christine Wilhelmine of Saxe-Eisenach
3. Princess Caroline of Nassau-Usingen
14. Count Christian Karl Reinhard of Leiningen-Dagsburg-Falkenburg
7. Countess Caroline Felizitas of Leiningen-Dagsburg-Falkenburg
15. Countess Katharina Polyxena of Solms-Rödelheim
