= Princess Marie of Hesse-Kassel =

Grand Duchess of Mecklenburg-Strelitz from 1817 to 1860

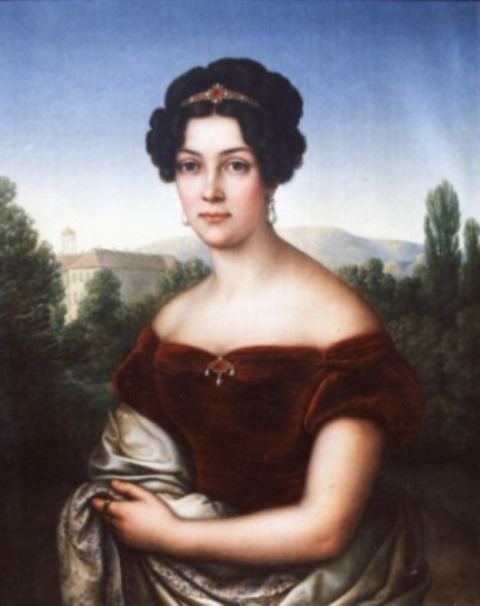

Grand Duchess consort of Mecklenburg-Strelitz
- Tenure: 12 August 1817 – 6 September 1860
- Born: 21 January 1796; Hanau, Hesse-Kassel
- Died: 30 December 1880 (aged 84); Neustrelitz, Mecklenburg-Strelitz
- Spouse: George, Grand Duke of Mecklenburg-Strelitz (m. 1817; died 1860)
- Issue: Duchess Luise; Frederick William, Grand Duke of Mecklenburg-Strelitz; Caroline Mariane, Crown Princess of Denmark; Duke Georg August
Names
- Marie Wilhelmine Friederike
- House: Mecklenburg-Strelitz; Hesse-Kassel
- Father: Prince Frederick of Hesse-Kassel
- Mother: Princess Caroline of Nassau-Usingen

Princess Marie of Hesse-Kassel (German: Marie Wilhelmine Friederike von Hessen-Kassel; 21 January 1796 – 30 December 1880) was the consort of George, Grand Duke of Mecklenburg-Strelitz.

== Early life ==
Princess Marie was born on 21 January 1796 as the second daughter of Prince Frederick of Hesse-Kassel and Princess Caroline of Nassau-Usingen, she was born at Hanau, Hesse-Kassel. Through her father, she was a great-granddaughter of George II of Great Britain. Her father's older brother was the Landgrave of Hesse-Kassel. In 1803, her uncle's title was raised to Elector of Hesse—whereby the entire Kassel branch of the Hesse dynasty gained an upward notch in hierarchy.

Her sister Augusta married Prince Adolphus, Duke of Cambridge, the seventh son of George III of the United Kingdom.

== Marriage ==
On 12 August 1817 in Kassel, Marie married George, Grand Duke of Mecklenburg-Strelitz, son of Charles II, Grand Duke of Mecklenburg. Together, they had four children:

- Duchess Luise of Mecklenburg-Strelitz (31 May 1818 – 1 February 1842).
- Frederick William, Grand Duke of Mecklenburg-Strelitz (17 October 1819 – 30 May 1904); married Princess Augusta of Cambridge.
- Duchess Caroline of Mecklenburg-Strelitz (10 January 1821 – 1 June 1876); married then-Crown Prince Frederick, the future Frederick VII of Denmark
- Duke Georg August of Mecklenburg-Strelitz (11 January 1824 – 20 June 1876); married Grand Duchess Catherine Mikhailovna of Russia.

== Later life and death ==
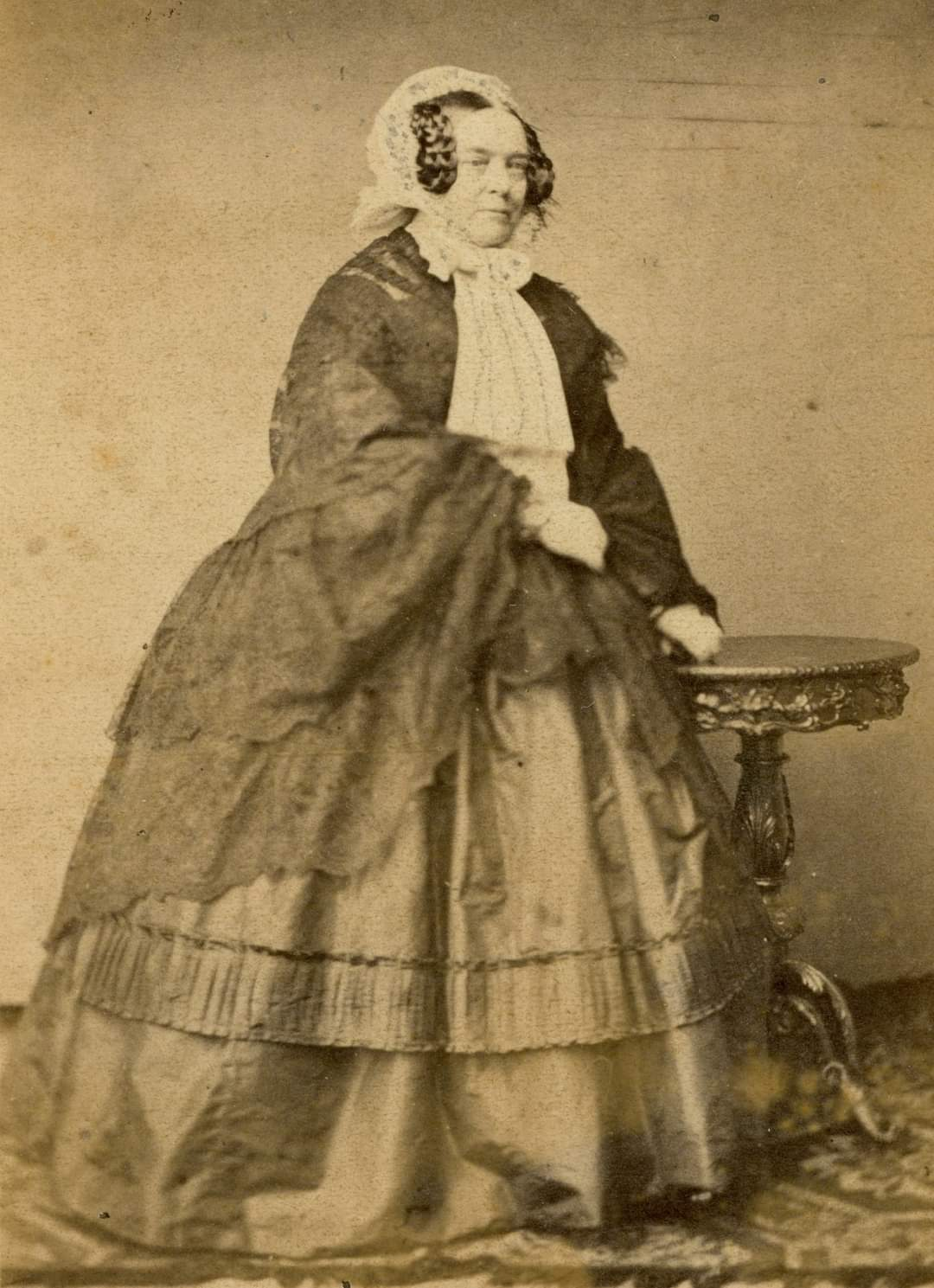
Photograph of Princess Marie in her later years, c. 1860–80

She became widowed when her husband, Georg, Grand Duke of Mecklenburg-Strelitz, died on 6 September 1860. In preparation for life as a widow, she had earlier arranged the construction of the Marienpalais residence in Neustrelitz.

During her widowhood, Marie remained socially and culturally active. She kept supporting charity projects and the arts. In 1861, she organized a gold laurel wreath in honour of Queen Maria Sophie of the Two Sicilies, asking over thirty German princesses to donate inscribed gold leaves. During the Austro-Prussian War, although her native Hesse allied with Austria, she issued appeals and backed relief efforts for wounded soldiers in Mecklenburg-Strelitz.

In June 1876, Marie’s two youngest children, Duchess Caroline and Duke Georg, died within a few weeks of each other. Following their deaths, she assumed the patronage of the Carolinestift hospital, which had previously been under her daughter’s oversight. In 1878 she commissioned the construction of a memorial church at Remplin, dedicated to her children.

Marie died on 30 December 1880 at 6:15 am in Neustrelitz, at age 84. Her funeral was held on 7 January 1881 in Mirow. She was buried beside her husband in the family crypt of the Johanniterkirche (St. John's Church), Mirow.

== Ancestry ==
Ancestors of Princess Marie of Hesse-Kassel

8. William VIII, Landgrave of Hesse-Kassel
4. Frederick II, Landgrave of Hesse-Kassel
9. Princess Dorothea Wilhelmine of Saxe-Zeitz
2. Prince Frederick of Hesse-Kassel
10. George II of Great Britain
5. Princess Mary of Great Britain
11. Princess Caroline of Brandenburg-Ansbach
1. Princess Marie of Hesse-Kassel
12. Charles, Prince of Nassau-Usingen
6. Charles William, Prince of Nassau-Usingen
13. Princess Christine Wilhelmine of Saxe-Eisenach
3. Princess Caroline of Nassau-Usingen
14. Count Christian Karl Reinhard of Leiningen-Dagsburg-Falkenburg
7. Countess Karoline Felizitas of Leiningen-Dagsburg-Falkenburg
15. Countess Katharina Polyxena of Solms-Rödelheim

Princess Marie of Hesse-Kassel House of Hesse-Kassel Cadet branch of the House of Hesse Born: 21 January 1796 Died: 30 December 1880
German royalty
Vacant Title last held by Princess Dorothea of Schleswig-Holstein-Sonderburg-Plön as Duchess of Mecklenburg-Strelitz	Grand Duchess of Mecklenburg-Strelitz; 1817–1860	Succeeded by Princess Augusta of Cambridge
