= Rumpenheim Castle =

National heritage site

Coordinates: 50°07′59″N 8°48′06″E

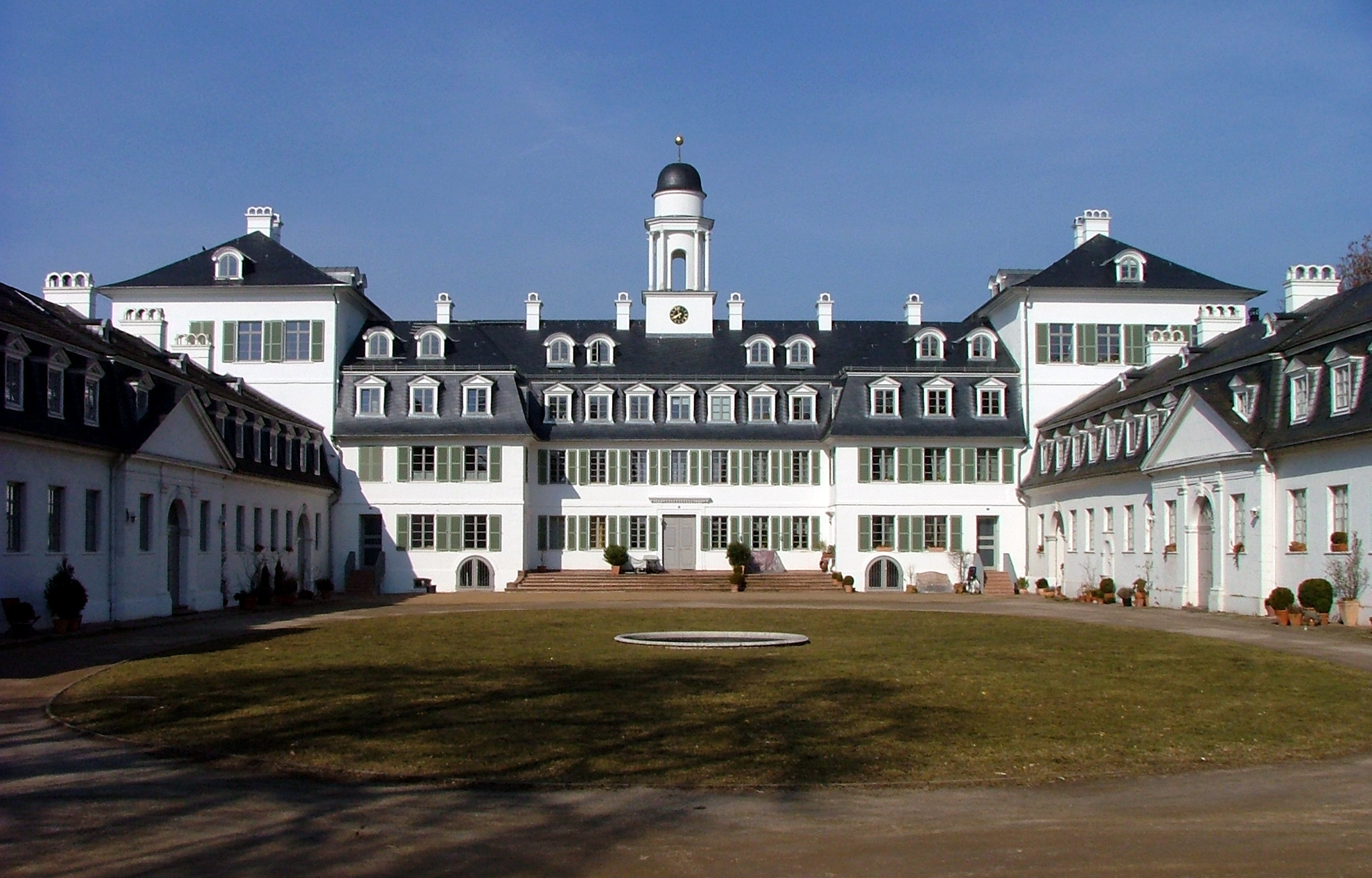
View of the cour d'honneur of the castle

Rumpenheim Castle is a Schloss located in the banks of the Main river in the German city of Offenbach am Main.

== History ==
The origin of the palace dates back to the manor house of Johann Georg Seifert von Edelsheim, a politician serving the County of Hanau. The main core of the castle, which runs parallel to the Main, roughly corresponds to this manor house. Likewise, Seifert von Edelsheim bought land around the main house, which would end up forming the current palace park.

In 1768, some years after the annexation of the County of Hanau to the Electorate of Hesse in 1736, the Seifert family with Edelsheim sold the manor house to Prince Charles of Hesse-Kassel. In the early 1780s, he sold the palace to his brother Frederick. During the first half of the 19th century, various renovation works were carried out, including the construction of new stables and a new reorganization of the park.

After the conquest of Hesse-Kassel by the Kingdom of Prussia in the context of the Austro-Prussian War, the palace became the private property of the branch of the House of Hesse descended from the Prince Frederick of Hesse-Cassel. This branch, known as Hesse-Kassel-Rumpenheim, continued to live in the palace until 1902, when, due to the marriage of Prince Frederick Charles to Princess Margaret of Prussia, after the death of her mother Victoria, dowager of Frederick III, German Emperor moved to the castle of Friderichshof.1 It was considered a common property of the sons of Frederick. Frederick's unmarried male children, Princes Frederick William and George Charles, died in 1876 and 1881, inhabited the castle on a regular basis.

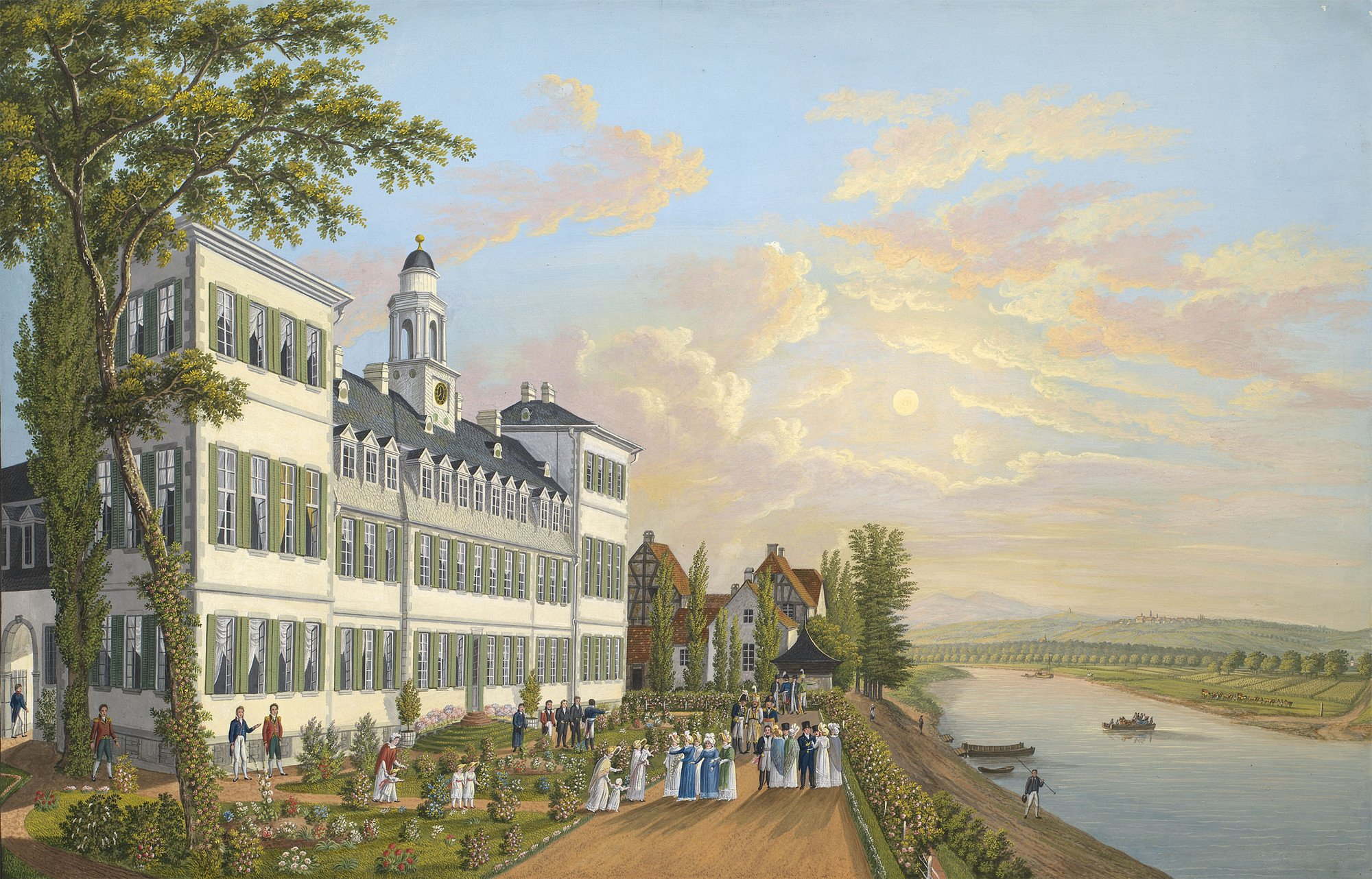
Drawing depicting the riverfront of the palace, circa 1820 (Royal Collection).

Paradoxically, the second half of the 19th century became a time of splendor for the castle as a destination for the European royalty related to the House of Hesse-Kassel, especially in summer. Among others, the following can be highlighted:

- Princess Mary Adelaide of Cambridge (daughter of Princess Augusta of Hesse-Kassel) and her family, including the then Princess Mary of Teck, future Queen Consort of the United Kingdom.
- Princess Louise of Hesse-Kassel, queen consort of Denmark, her husband, Christian IX, and their children, including the future George I of Greece and Alexandra, Queen Consort of the United Kingdom.
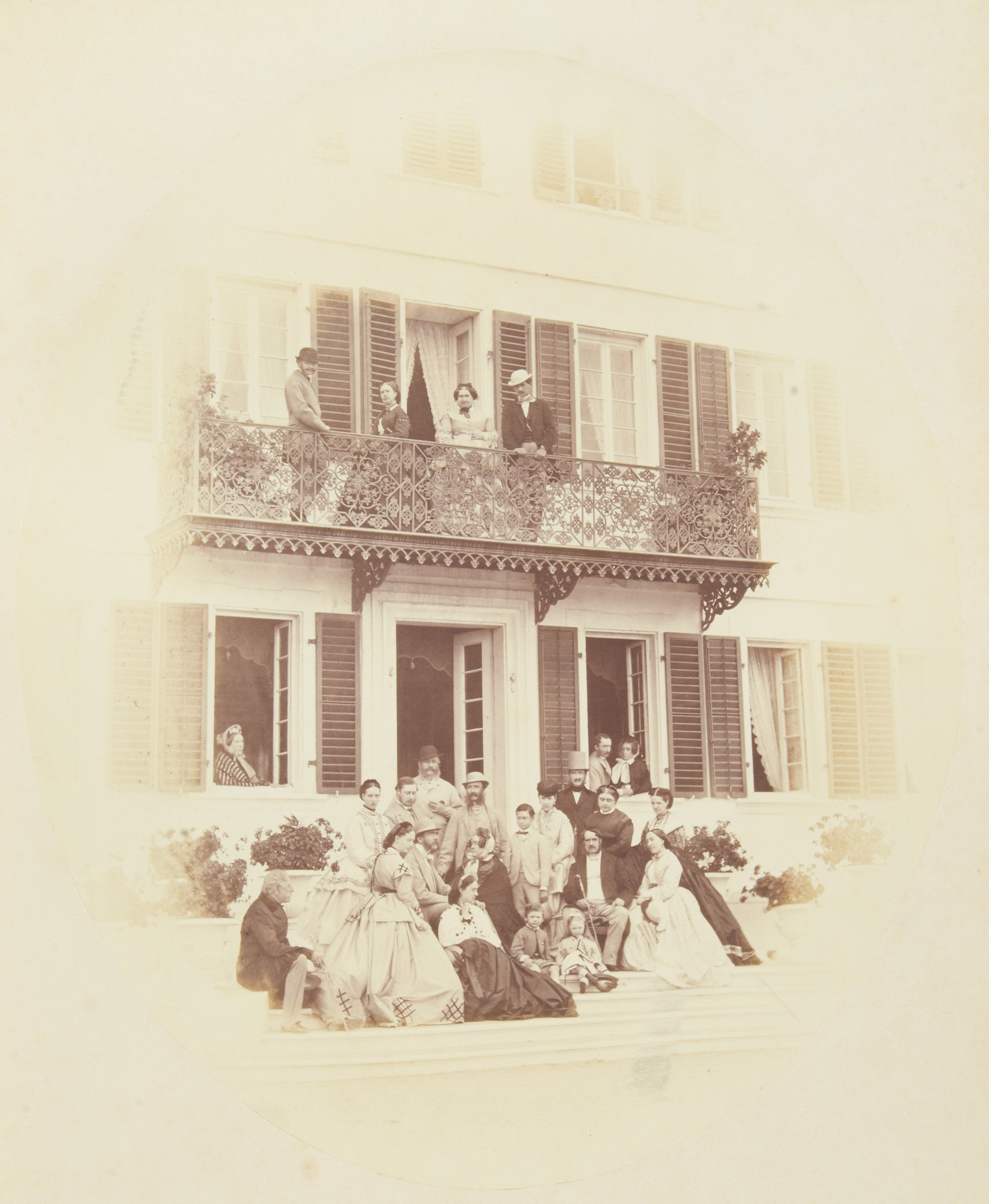
  Gathering of royals in the castle of Rumpenheim (Including Augusta, Duchess of Cambridge; Mary Adelaide, Duchess of Teck; Albert Edward, Prince of Wales, later King Edward VII and Princess Alexandra of Wales, later Queen Alexandra) (Friedrich Weisbrod, 1865)

In 1943, the main part of the structure was bombed, as a consequence of the Second World War. The building continued to be in a state of ruin and abandonment and was acquired in 1965 from the House of Hesse by the town of Offenbach am Mein. Subsequently, it has been gradually restored and today houses luxury apartments.

== Architecture ==
In its original composition before the restoration after the damage suffered in the Second World War, the palace was made up of a main nucleus parallel to the Main river, of three heights finished off by a last floor under cover. This main body was flanked by two towers that had one more floor than the main body. On the façade opposite the river, the palace had two parallel wings arranged perpendicular to the main façade, forming a cour d'honneur. The wings had a single floor and a floor below deck and were finished off at their final ends with two two-story pavilions and a floor below deck. The interior was richly decorated with antique furniture.

The palace was characteristically painted white and had slate roofs.

At present, the structure is, in general lines, preserved.

== Sources ==
- Pope-Hennesy, James (1959). "Book I. Princess May. 4. Rumpenheim, Neustrelitz and Reinthal. VI.". Queen Mary. London: George Allen and Unwin, Ltd. pp. 105–111.
- Battiscombe, Georgina (1969). "Chapter one ("Danish childhood") and two ("The Prince of Wales")". Queen Alexandra. London: Constable. pp. 3–30. ISBN 0-09-456560-0.
