= Frederick William, Grand Duke of Mecklenburg-Strelitz =

Grand Duke of Mecklenburg-Strelitz from 1860 to 1904

Frederick William
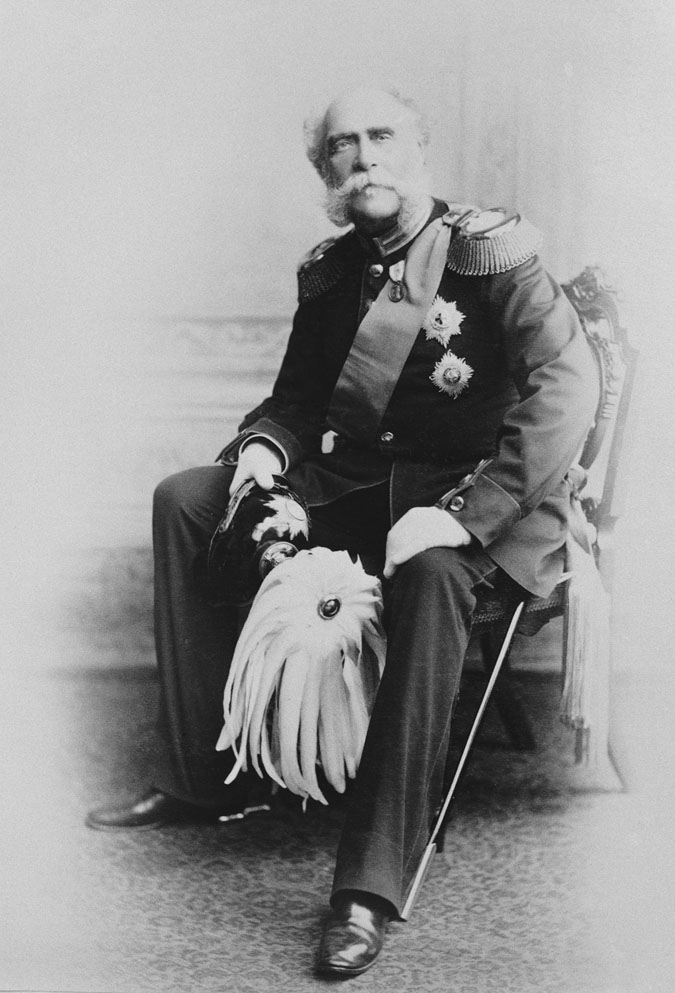
- The Grand Duke c. 1887

Grand Duke of Mecklenburg-Strelitz
- Reign: 6 September 1860 – 30 May 1904
- Predecessor: George
- Successor: Adolf Frederick V
- Born: 17 October 1819; Neustrelitz, Mecklenburg-Strelitz, German Confederation
- Died: 30 May 1904 (aged 84); Neustrelitz, Mecklenburg-Strelitz, Germany
- Burial: 6 June 1904; Mirow, Mecklenburg-Strelitz
- Spouse: Princess Augusta of Cambridge (m. 1843)
- Issue: Duke Frederick William; Adolphus Frederick V, Grand Duke of Mecklenburg-Strelitz
Names
- German: Friedrich Wilhelm Karl Georg Ernst Adolf Gustav
- House: Mecklenburg-Strelitz
- Father: George, Grand Duke of Mecklenburg-Strelitz
- Mother: Princess Marie of Hesse-Kassel
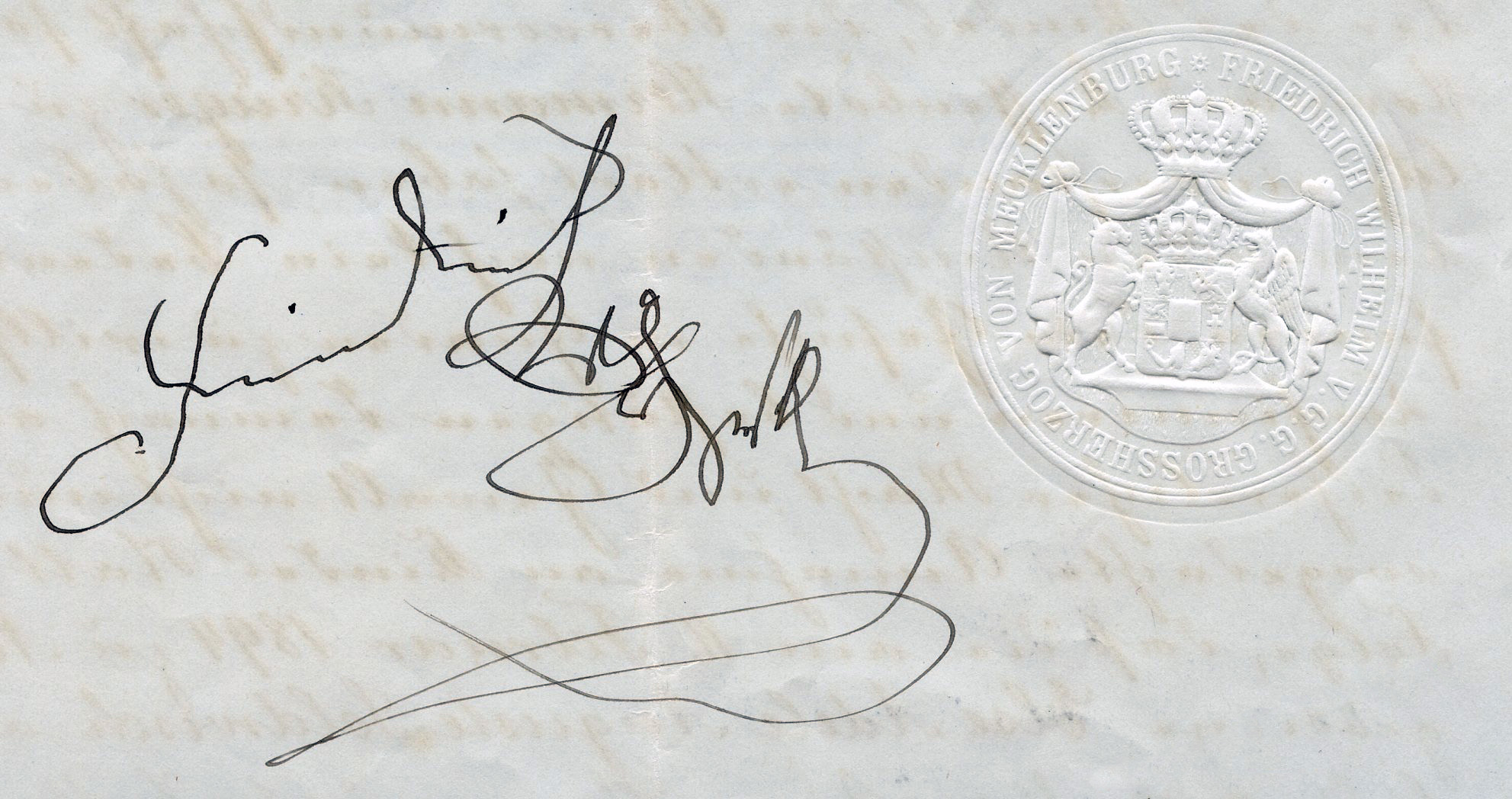
- Signature

Frederick William (17 October 1819 – 30 May 1904) was a German sovereign who ruled over the state of Mecklenburg-Strelitz as grand duke from 1860 until his death.

== Biography ==
He was born in Neustrelitz, the son of Grand Duke Georg of Mecklenburg-Strelitz and Princess Marie of Hesse-Kassel. He spent his youth in Neustrelitz and later went to study history and jurisprudence in University of Bonn where he befriended Prince Albert of Saxe-Coburg and Gotha. After finishing his studies, he went travelling to Italy and Switzerland. He became a Doctor of Civil Law of the University of Oxford.

Friedrich Wilhelm succeeded as grand duke on the death of his father on 6 September 1860. During his reign, Mecklenburg-Strelitz became a member first of the North German Confederation and then the German Empire. Friedrich Wilhelm was a large land owner with more than half of the entire grand duchy as his personal property.

He died at Neustrelitz on 30 May 1904 and was succeeded by his only surviving son, Adolf Friedrich V.

== Marriage and children ==
Friedrich Wilhelm was married on 28 June 1843 at Buckingham Palace to his first cousin, Princess Augusta of Cambridge, a member of the British royal family and a granddaughter of King George III. The two were also second cousins on their fathers' side. They had two sons:

- Duke Frederick William of Mecklenburg-Strelitz (born and died in London, 13 January 1845).
- Duke Adolphus Frederick of Mecklenburg-Strelitz (1848–1914); succeeded his father as Adolphus Frederick V, Grand Duke of Mecklenburg-Strelitz.

Friedrich Wilhelm and his wife Augusta celebrated their diamond wedding anniversary by distributing 25 Pfennig from the public treasury to every citizen of the grand duchy.

== Titles, styles and honours ==
=== Titles and styles ===
- 17 October 1819 – 6 September 1860: His Royal Highness The Hereditary Grand Duke of Mecklenburg-Strelitz
- 6 September 1860 – 30 May 1904: His Royal Highness The Grand Duke of Mecklenburg-Strelitz

=== Honours ===
German honours

- Mecklenburg:
  - Grand Cross of the Wendish Crown, with Crown in Ore and Collar
  - Memorial Medal for Grand Duke Friedrich Franz III
- Ascanian duchies: Grand Cross of the Order of Albert the Bear, 30 May 1862
- Brunswick: Grand Cross of the Order of Henry the Lion
- (Saxe-Coburg and Gotha) (Duchy of Saxe-Altenburg) (Saxe-Meiningen) Ernestine duchies: Grand Cross of the Saxe-Ernestine House Order, 1877
- Hanover:
  - Knight of St. George, 1861
  - Grand Cross of the Royal Guelphic Order
- Hesse-Darmstadt: Grand Cross of the Ludwig Order, 6 September 1860
- Hesse-Kassel: Grand Cross of the Golden Lion, 18 December 1844
- Nassau: Knight of the Gold Lion of Nassau, August 1865
- Oldenburg: Grand Cross of the Order of Duke Peter Friedrich Ludwig, with Golden Crown, 23 August 1863
- Prussia:
  - Knight of the Black Eagle, 29 February 1840; with Collar, 1883
  - Grand Cross of the Red Eagle
  - Grand Commander's Cross of the Royal House Order of Hohenzollern, with Collar, 11 June 1879
- Saxony: Knight of the Rue Crown, 1872

Foreign honours

- Austrian Empire: Grand Cross of the Royal Hungarian Order of St. Stephen, 1860
- Denmark: Knight of the Elephant, 17 October 1860
- Greece: Grand Cross of the Redeemer
- Montenegro: Grand Cross of the Order of Prince Danilo I
- Netherlands: Grand Cross of the Netherlands Lion
- United Principalities of Romania: Grand Cross of the Star of Romania
- Russian Empire:
  - Knight of St. Andrew, 1877
  - Knight of St. Alexander Nevsky
  - Knight of the White Eagle
  - Knight of St. Anna, 1st Class
  - Knight of St. Stanislaus, 1st Class
- Serbia: Grand Cross of the Cross of Takovo
- Sweden-Norway: Knight of the Seraphim, 19 October 1860
- United Kingdom:
  - Honorary Grand Cross of the Bath (civil), 22 January 1848
  - Stranger Knight of the Garter, 12 August 1862

== Ancestry ==
Ancestors of Frederick William, Grand Duke of Mecklenburg-Strelitz

8. Duke Charles Louis Frederick of Mecklenburg
4. Charles II, Grand Duke of Mecklenburg-Strelitz
9. Princess Elisabeth Albertine of Saxe-Hildburghausen
2. George, Grand Duke of Mecklenburg-Strelitz
10. Prince George William of Hesse-Darmstadt
5. Princess Friederike of Hesse-Darmstadt
11. Countess Maria Louise Albertine of Leiningen-Falkenburg-Dagsburg
1. Frederick William, Grand Duke of Mecklenburg-Strelitz
12. Frederick II, Landgrave of Hesse-Kassel
6. Prince Frederick of Hesse-Kassel
13. Princess Mary of Great Britain
3. Princess Marie of Hesse-Kassel
14. Charles William, Prince of Nassau-Usingen
7. Princess Caroline of Nassau-Usingen
15. Countess Caroline Felizitas of Leiningen-Dagsburg

Frederick William, Grand Duke of Mecklenburg-Strelitz House of Mecklenburg-Strelitz Cadet branch of the House of Mecklenburg Born: 17 October 1819 Died: 30 May 1904
Regnal titles
Preceded by Georg	Grand Duke of Mecklenburg-Strelitz; 1860–1904	Succeeded by Adolf Friedrich V
