= George, Grand Duke of Mecklenburg-Strelitz =

Grand Duke of Mecklenburg-Strelitz from 1816 to 1860

George
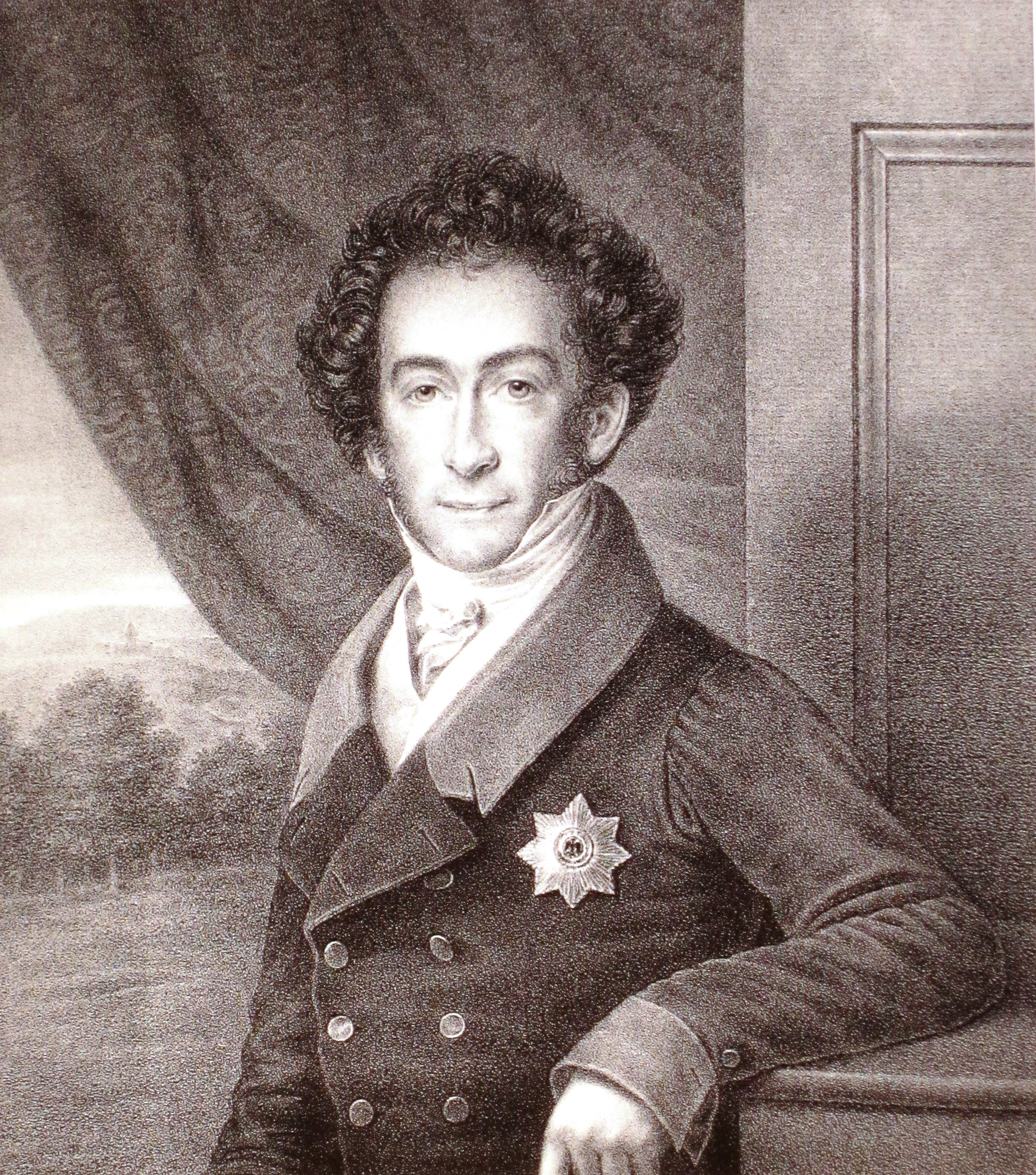
- Portrait after Franz Krüger

Grand Duke of Mecklenburg-Strelitz
- Reign: 6 November 1816 – 6 September 1860
- Predecessor: Charles II
- Successor: Frederick William
- Born: 12 August 1779; Hanover, Electorate of Hanover
- Died: 6 September 1860 (aged 81); Neustrelitz, Grand Duchy of Mecklenburg-Strelitz
- Spouse: Princess Marie of Hesse-Kassel (m. 1817)
- Issue: Duchess Luise of Mecklenburg-Strelitz; Frederick William, Grand Duke of Mecklenburg-Strelitz; Caroline Mariane, Crown Princess of Denmark; Duke Georg August of Mecklenburg-Strelitz
- House: House of Mecklenburg-Strelitz
- Father: Charles II, Grand Duke of Mecklenburg
- Mother: Princess Friederike of Hesse-Darmstadt
- Religion: Lutheranism

George (German: Georg; 12 August 1779 – 6 September 1860) ruled the state of Mecklenburg-Strelitz as Grand Duke of Mecklenburg from 1816 until his death.

== Early life ==
Duke George Frederick Charles Joseph of Mecklenburg was born in Hanover, the eighth child of Charles II, Grand Duke of Mecklenburg-Strelitz, and his first wife, Princess Friederike of Hesse-Darmstadt. Following the death of his mother in 1782 his father married her sister Charlotte two years later in 1784 and the family moved from Hanover to Darmstadt. George remained in Darmstadt until 1794, when his father succeeded as the ruling Duke of Mecklenburg-Strelitz and George accompanied his father to Neustrelitz.

== Heir apparent ==
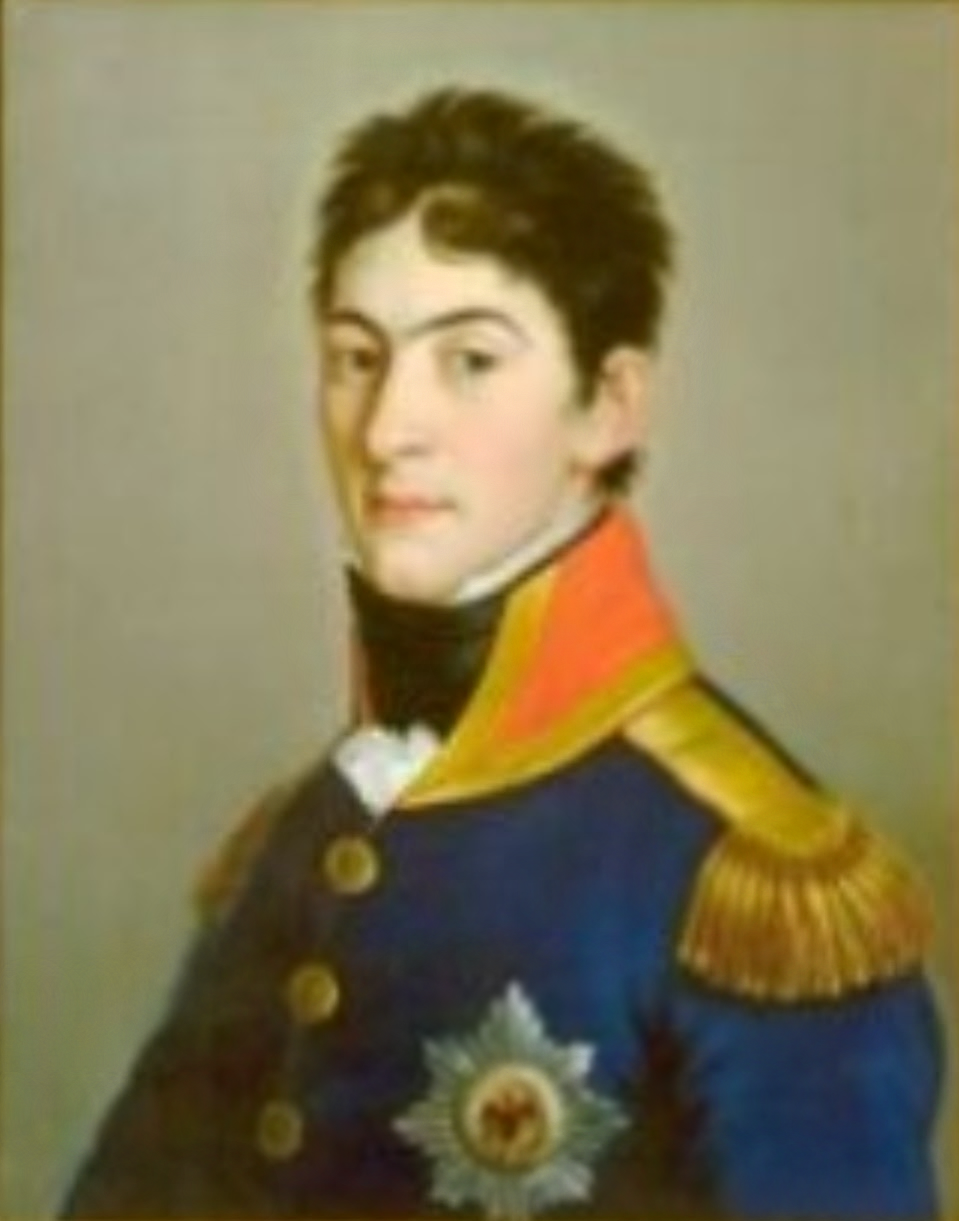
Portrait of George, 1808

Soon after arriving in Neustrelitz, George enrolled at the University of Rostock, where he studied until 1799. After leaving university, George went to Berlin, where he lived at the Prussian court. George's sister Louise was married to the Prussian king, Frederick William III. In 1802 he went to Italy, where he lived until 1804, He then returned to Germany and settled in Darmstadt.

Following the Battle of Jena-Auerstedt in 1806, George travelled to Paris, where he negotiated the entry of Mecklenburg-Strelitz into the Confederation of the Rhine. He also attended the Congress of Vienna in 1814, where Mecklenburg-Strelitz was raised to the status of a grand duchy.

== Grand Duke ==
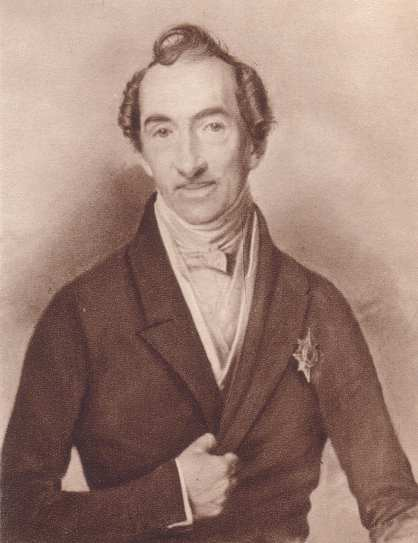
Grand Duke George in old age

When George succeeded his father on 6 November 1816, he found the grand duchy in a bad state. He set about raising the standard of education of his subjects by building schools. By the end of his reign, the majority of his subjects could read and write. He also improved agriculture in the grand duchy and abolished serfdom.

== Marriage and children ==
On 12 August 1817 in Kassel, George married Princess Marie of Hesse-Kassel, the daughter of Prince Frederick of Hesse-Kassel and his wife, Princess Caroline of Nassau-Usingen. Together they had four children:

- Duchess Luise of Mecklenburg-Strelitz (1818–1842)
- Frederick William, Grand Duke of Mecklenburg-Strelitz (1819–1904) married Princess Augusta of Cambridge
- Duchess Caroline of Mecklenburg-Strelitz (1821–1876) married Frederick VII of Denmark
- Duke Georg August of Mecklenburg-Strelitz (1824–1876) married Grand Duchess Catherine Mikhailovna of Russia.

== Death ==
George died on 6 September 1860 at Neustrelitz, aged 81, and was succeeded by his eldest son, Friedrich Wilhelm. His body was buried in the New Mausoleum in the Johanniterkirche, Mirow, Mecklenburg.

== Ancestry ==
Ancestors of George, Grand Duke of Mecklenburg-Strelitz

8. Adolf Frederick II, Duke of Mecklenburg-Strelitz
4. Duke Charles Louis Frederick of Mecklenburg-Strelitz
9. Christiane Emilie, Princess of Schwarzburg-Sondershausen
2. Charles II, Grand Duke of Mecklenburg-Strelitz
10. Ernest Frederick I, Duke of Saxe-Hildburghausen
5. Princess Elisabeth Albertine of Saxe-Hildburghausen
11. Countess Sophia Albertine of Erbach-Erbach
1. George, Grand Duke of Mecklenburg-Strelitz
12. Louis VIII, Landgrave of Hesse-Darmstadt
6. Prince George William of Hesse-Darmstadt
13. Charlotte, Countess of Hanau-Lichtenberg
3. Princess Friederike of Hesse-Darmstadt
14. Christian Karl Reinhard of Leiningen-Dachsburg-Falkenburg-Heidesheim
7. Countess Maria Louise Albertine of Leiningen-Falkenburg-Dagsburg
15. Catharine Polyxene, Countess of Solms-Rödelheim and Assenheim

George, Grand Duke of Mecklenburg-Strelitz House of Mecklenburg-Strelitz Cadet branch of the House of Mecklenburg Born: 12 August 1779 Died: 6 September 1860
Regnal titles
Preceded by Charles II	Grand Duke of Mecklenburg-Strelitz; 1816–1860	Succeeded by Friedrich Wilhelm
