= Prince Adolphus, Duke of Cambridge =

British prince (1774–1850)

Prince Adolphus
- Duke of Cambridge (more)
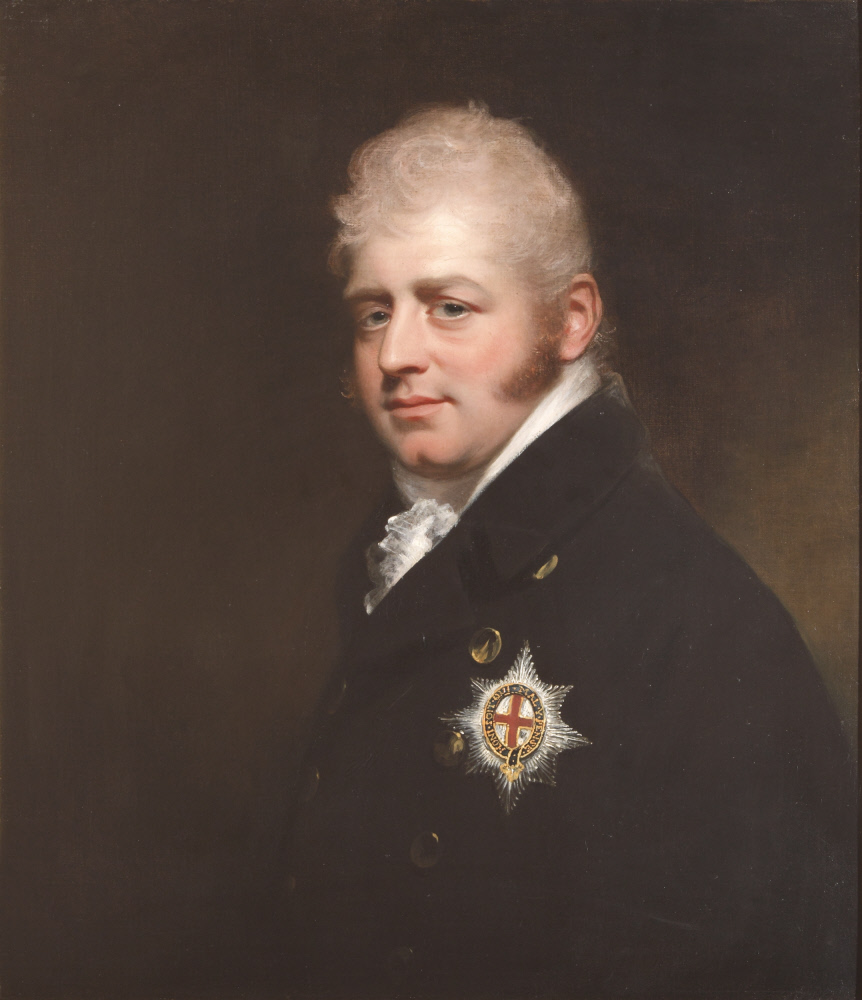
- Portrait by William Beechey, 1808

Viceroy of the Kingdom of Hanover
- In office 24 October 1816 – 20 June 1837
- Monarchs: George III; George IV; William IV
- Preceded by: General von Bülow
- Succeeded by: position abolished
- Born: 24 February 1774; Buckingham House, London, England
- Died: 8 July 1850 (aged 76); Cambridge House, Piccadilly, England
- Burial: 17 July 1850; St Anne's Church, Kew, Surrey; 10 January 1930; Royal Vault, St George's Chapel, Windsor Castle
- Spouse: Princess Augusta of Hesse-Kassel (m. 1818)
- Issue: Prince George, Duke of Cambridge; Augusta, Grand Duchess of Mecklenburg-Strelitz; Princess Mary Adelaide, Duchess of Teck
Names
- Adolphus Frederick
- House: Hanover
- Father: George III
- Mother: Charlotte of Mecklenburg-Strelitz
- Military career
- Allegiance: Kingdom of Great Britain; United Kingdom; Kingdom of Hanover
- Branch: Hanoverian Army; British Army
- Years of active service: 1791–1813
- Rank: Field Marshal (active service)
- Commands: Hanoverian Guards
- Conflicts: French Revolutionary Wars; Battle of Hondschoote; Napoleonic Wars; War of the Second Coalition; War of the Sixth Coalition

Prince Adolphus, Duke of Cambridge (Adolphus Frederick; 24 February 1774 – 8 July 1850) was the tenth child and seventh son of King George III of the United Kingdom and Queen Charlotte. He held the title of Duke of Cambridge from 1801 until his death. From 1816 to 1837, he served as Viceroy of the Kingdom of Hanover on behalf of his elder brothers King George IV and King William IV.

Adolphus married Princess Augusta of Hesse-Kassel in 1818, with whom he had three children: Prince George, Duke of Cambridge, Princess Augusta of Cambridge and Princess Mary Adelaide of Cambridge. He was the maternal grandfather of Princess Victoria Mary of Teck, later Queen Mary, who became consort to King George V.

== Early life ==
Adolphus was born in February 1774 at Buckingham House, then known as the "Queen's House", in the City and Liberty of Westminster, now within Greater London. He was the youngest son of King George III and Queen Charlotte to survive childhood.

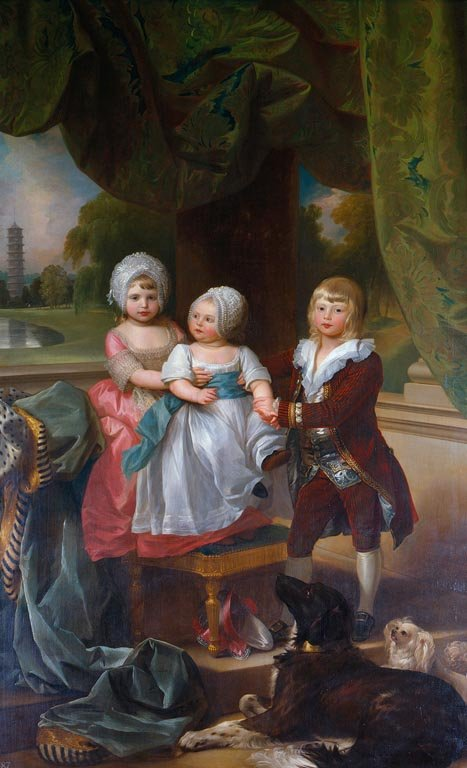
Prince Adolphus at the age of four with his younger sisters Mary and Sophia in 1778, by Benjamin West

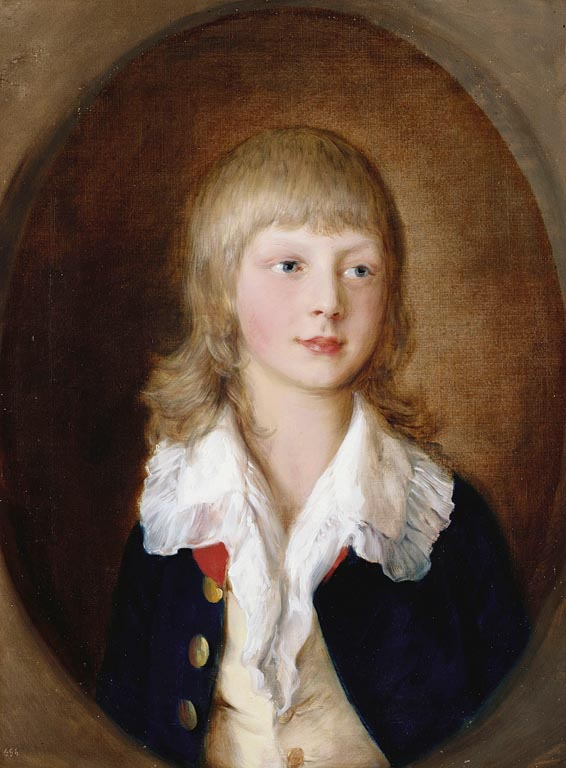
Portrait of Prince Adolphus, by Thomas Gainsborough, c. 1782

Adolphus was baptised on 24 March 1774 in the Great Council Chamber at St James's Palace by Frederick Cornwallis, Archbishop of Canterbury. His godparents were Prince John Adolphus of Saxe-Gotha-Altenburg (his great-uncle, for whom the Earl of Hertford, Lord Chamberlain, stood proxy), Landgrave Charles of Hesse-Kassel (his first cousin once removed, for whom the Earl of Jersey, Extra Lord of the Bedchamber, stood proxy) and Princess Wilhelmina of Orange (the wife of his first cousin once removed, for whom Elizabeth Howard, Dowager Countess of Effingham, former Lady of the Bedchamber to Queen Charlotte, stood proxy).

Adolphus was tutored at home until summer 1786, when he was sent to the University of Göttingen in Germany, along with his brothers Prince Ernest (created Duke of Cumberland in 1799) and Prince Augustus (created Duke of Sussex in 1801).

== Military career ==
Adolphus was made honorary Colonel-in-Chief of the Hanoverian Guard Foot Regiment 1789–1803, but his military training began in 1791, when he and Ernest went to Hanover to study under the supervision of the Hanoverian commander Field Marshal Wilhelm von Freytag. He remained on Freytag's staff during the Flanders Campaign in 1793. His first taste of action was at Famars on 23 May. He was wounded and captured at the Battle of Hondschoote 6 September, but was quickly rescued. As a Hanoverian General-Major, he commanded a Hessian brigade under his paternal great-uncle, General Johann Ludwig von Wallmoden-Gimborn in Autumn 1794, then commanded the Hanoverian Guards during the retreat through Holland. Remaining in Germany, he commanded a brigade of the Corps of Observation from 22 October 1796 until 12 January 1798. He was made a British Army colonel in 1794, and lieutenant general on 24 August 1798. In 1800 – whilst stationed in the Electorate of Hanover – he attended the founding of a village (part of the settlement of the moorlands north of Bremen), which was named after him: Adolphsdorf (since 1974 a component locality of Grasberg).

During the War of the Second Coalition against France (1799–1802), Adolphus traveled to Berlin in 1801, in order to prevent the impending Prussian occupation of the Electorate. France demanded it, as it was stipulated in the Peace of Basel (1795), obliging Prussia to ensure the Holy Roman Empire's neutrality in all the latter's territories north of the demarcation line at the river Main, including Hanover. Regular Hanoverian troops, therefore, had been commandeered to join the multilateral so-called "Demarcation Army". His efforts were in vain. In 1803, he was senior army commander, and replaced Wallmoden as commander on the Weser on 1 June. With the advance of French forces on one side and 24,000 Prussian soldiers on the other, the situation was hopeless. Cambridge refused to become involved in discussions of capitulation, handed over his command to Hammerstein (Ompteda claims he was forced to resign), and withdrew to England. A plan to recruit additional soldiers in Hanover to be commanded by the Prince had also failed.

In 1803, Adolphus was appointed as commander-in-chief of the newly founded King's German Legion, and in 1813, he became field marshal. George III appointed Adolphus a Knight of the Garter on 2 June 1776, and created him Duke of Cambridge, Earl of Tipperary, and Baron Culloden on 24 November 1801.

The Duke served as colonel-in-chief of the Coldstream Regiment of Foot Guards (Coldstream Guards after 1855) from September 1805, and as colonel-in-chief of the 60th (The Duke of York's Own Rifle Corps) Regiment of Foot from January 1824. After the collapse of Napoleon's empire, he was Military Governor of Hanover from 4 November 1813 – 24 October 1816, then Governor General of Hanover from 24 October 1816 – 20 June 1837 (viceroy from 22 February 1831). He was made Field Marshal 26 November 1813. While he was Viceroy, the Duke became patron of the Cambridge-Dragoner, 'Cambridge Dragoons'. Regiment of the Hanoverian Army. This regiment was stationed in Celle, and their barracks, Cambridge-Dragoner Kaserne, were used by the Bundeswehr until 1995. The "March of the Hannoversches Cambridge-Dragoner-Regiment " is part of the Bundeswehr's traditional music repertoire.

== Marriage ==
After the death of Princess Charlotte in 1817, the Duke was set the task of finding a bride for his eldest unmarried brother, the Duke of Clarence (later William IV), in the hope of securing heirs to the throne—Charlotte had been the only legitimate grandchild of George III, despite the fact that the King had twelve surviving children. After several false starts, the Duke of Clarence settled on Princess Adelaide of Saxe-Meiningen. The way was cleared for the Duke of Cambridge to find a bride for himself.

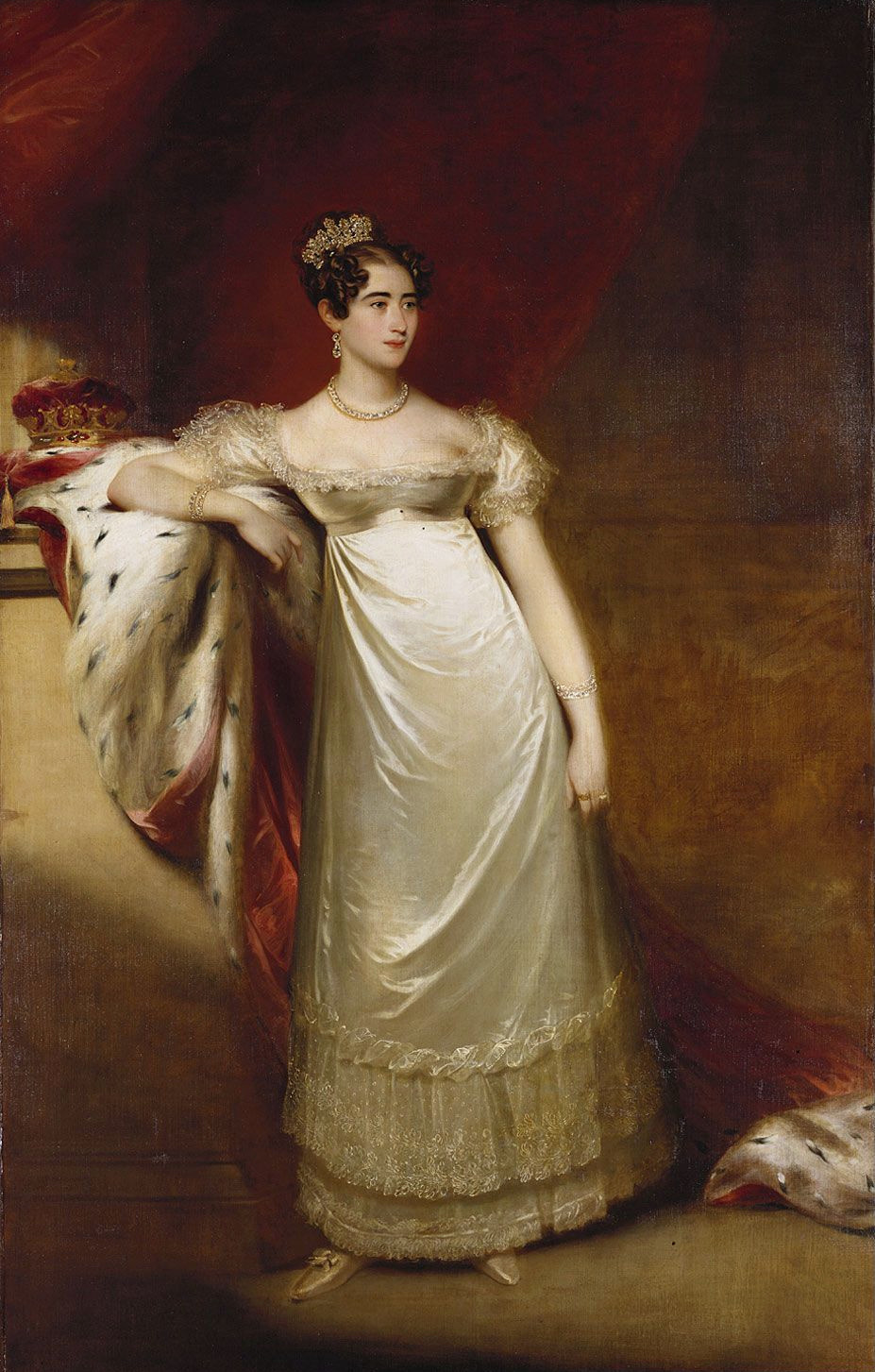
Portrait of Augusta, Duchess of Cambridge, by William Beechey, 1818

The Duke of Cambridge was married first at Kassel, Hesse on 7 May and then at Buckingham Palace on 1 June 1818 to his second cousin Augusta (25 July 1797 – 6 April 1889), the third daughter of Prince Frederick of Hesse.

== Viceroy ==
From 1816 until 1837, the Duke of Cambridge served as viceroy of the Kingdom of Hanover, representing his elder brothers, first George IV and later William IV. His tenure came to an end following the accession of his niece, Queen Victoria, on 20 June 1837. As Hanover adhered to Salic Law, which barred female succession, the personal union between the British and Hanoverian crowns dissolved, and the throne of Hanover passed to the next eldest of Cambridge's brothers, Ernest Augustus, Duke of Cumberland. With the end of the union, the Duke of Cambridge relinquished his post and returned to Britain.

== Residences ==
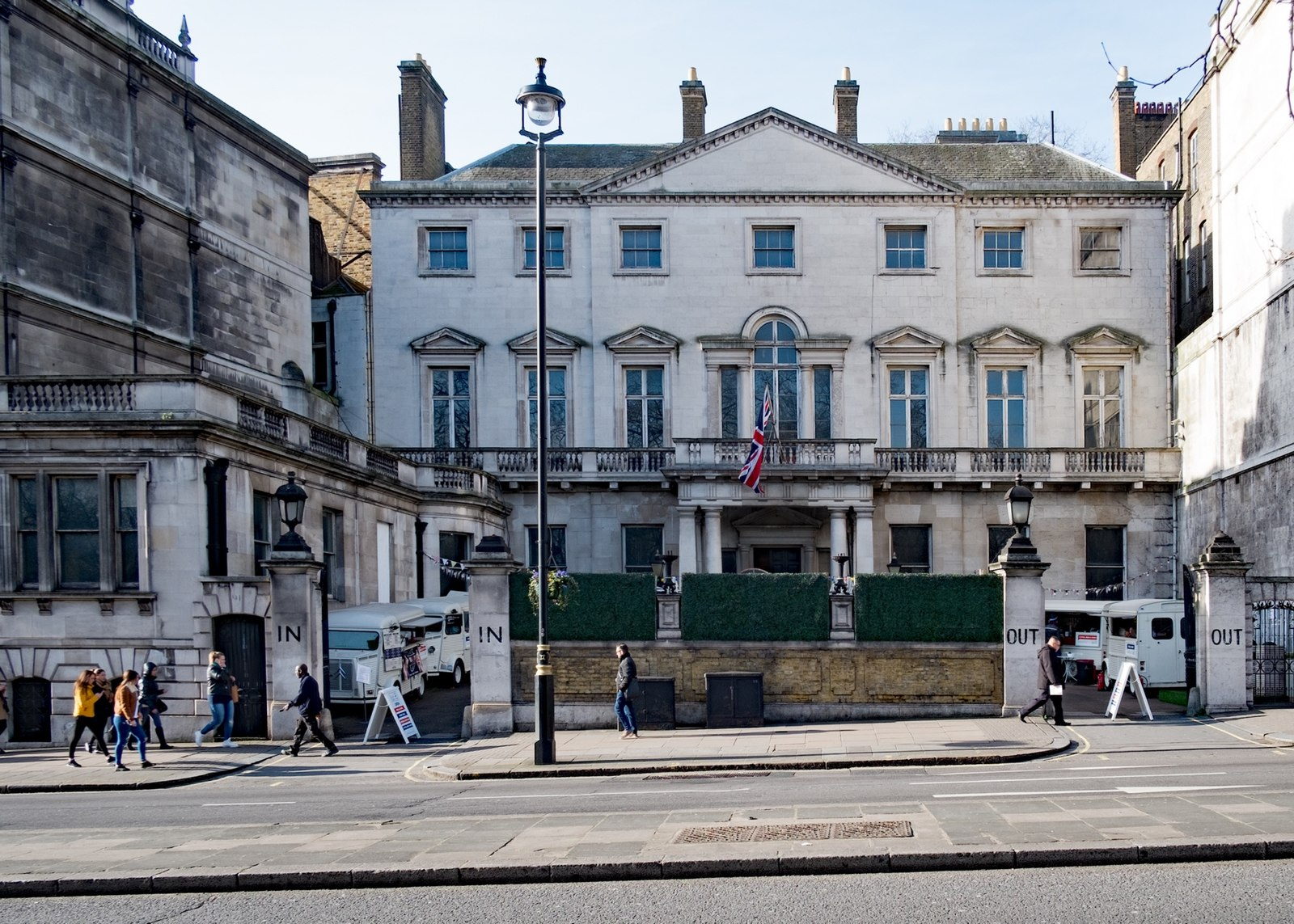
Cambridge House, Piccadilly - Prince Adolphus' London Residence from c. 1829 to 1850

During the 1820s Adolphus maintained a London Residence known as Cambridge House at 8 South Audley Street, Mayfair; the House had briefly served as the home of his deceased sister-in-law Caroline of Brunswick during the final year of her life. During Adolphus's tenure as Viceroy of Hanover the House was sometimes used as the London residence of his brother Prince Frederick, Duke of York and Albany, who was recorded as living at Cambridge House, South Audley Street in 1826.

The lease of No. 8 South Audley Street was surrendered in 1830, and a lease of a larger house at 94 Piccadilly (then known as Cholmondeley House) was acquired between 1829 and 1830 by the Duke of Cambridge, after which the House took on the name Cambridge House. No. 94 Piccadilly property remained as Prince Adolphus's London home until his death in 1850, and has since retained the name Cambridge House.

== Death ==
The Duke of Cambridge died on 8 July 1850 at Cambridge House, Piccadilly, London, aged 76, and was buried in a specially-constructed extension to St Anne's Church, Kew. The Duchess was buried alongside him in 1889. Their remains were removed to St George's Chapel, Windsor Castle in 1930. The Prince's only son, Prince George, succeeded to his peerages.

== Honours ==
- KG: Knight of the Garter, 2 June 1786
- GCB: Knight Grand Cross of the Bath (military), 2 January 1815
- GCMG: Grand Master of St Michael and St George, 20 June 1825; Principal Knight Grand Cross, 16 August 1832
- PC: Privy Counsellor, 1802
- GCH: Knight Grand Cross of the Royal Guelphic Order, 12 August 1815

Foreign

- Knight of the Black Eagle, 21 September 1823 (Prussia)
- Knight of St. Andrew, 1844 (Russia)
- Knight Grand Cross of the Golden Lion, 6 May 1818 (Hesse-Kassel)

== Arms ==
The Duke's arms were the Royal Arms of the House of Hanover, with a three-point label of difference: the first and third points containing two hearts, and the centre point bearing a red cross. His arms were adopted by his younger daughter, Princess Mary Adelaide, and her heirs included them in their arms quartered with the arms of the Duke of Teck.

Coat of arms of Prince Adolphus, Duke of Cambridge, used from 1801 until his death.

== Issue ==
The Duke and Duchess of Cambridge had three children:

Name	Birth	Death	Notes
Prince George, Duke of Cambridge	26 March 1819	17 March 1904	married 1847, Sarah Louisa Fairbrother; had issue (this marriage was contracted in contravention of the Royal Marriages Act and was not recognised in law).
Princess Augusta of Cambridge	19 July 1822	4 December 1916	married 1843, Friedrich Wilhelm, Grand Duke of Mecklenburg-Strelitz; had issue
Princess Mary Adelaide of Cambridge	27 November 1833	27 October 1897	married 1866, Francis, Duke of Teck; had issue, including Mary of Teck, later Queen consort of the United Kingdom.

== Ancestors ==
Ancestors of Prince Adolphus, Duke of Cambridge

8. George II of Great Britain
4. Frederick, Prince of Wales
9. Princess Caroline of Brandenburg-Ansbach
2. George III
10. Frederick II, Duke of Saxe-Gotha-Altenburg
5. Princess Augusta of Saxe-Gotha
11. Princess Magdalena Augusta of Anhalt-Zerbst
1. Prince Adolphus, Duke of Cambridge
12. Adolphus Frederick II, Duke of Mecklenburg-Strelitz
6. Duke Charles Louis Frederick of Mecklenburg
13. Princess Christiana Emilia Antonia of Schwarzburg-Sondershausen
3. Princess Charlotte of Mecklenburg-Strelitz
14. Ernest Frederick I, Duke of Saxe-Hildburghausen
7. Princess Elisabeth Albertine of Saxe-Hildburghausen
15. Countess Sophia Albertine of Erbach-Erbach

== Family tree ==
Family tree of Dukes and Marquesses of Cambridge

King James VI and I (1566–1625)
Elizabeth Stuart (1596–1662); Queen of Bohemia	King Charles I (1600–1649)
Duke of Gloucester (4th creation) and Earl of Cambridge (5th creation), 1659
Sophia of Hanover (1630–1714)	King Charles II (1630–1685)	King James VII and II (1633–1701)	Henry Stuart (1640–1660); Duke of Gloucester, etc.
Dukedom of Gloucester (4th creation) and Earl of Cambridge (5th creation) extinct, 1660
Duke of Cambridge (1st creation), Earl of Cambridge (6th creation), and Baron of Dauntsey (1st creation), 1664	Duke of Cambridge (2nd creation), Earl of Cambridge (7th creation), and Baron of Dauntsey (2nd creation), 1667
King George I (1660–1727)	Charles Stuart (1660–1661) styled Duke of Cambridge	James Stuart (1663–1667); Duke of Cambridge, etc.	Edgar Stuart (1667–1671); Duke of Cambridge, etc.	Charles Stuart (1677) styled Duke of Cambridge
Dukedom of Cambridge (1st creation), Earldom of Cambridge (6th creation), and Barony of Dauntsey (1st creation) extinct, 1667	Dukedom of Cambridge (2nd creation), Earldom of Cambridge (7th creation), and Barony of Dauntsey (2nd creation) extinct, 1671
Duke of Cambridge (3rd creation) and Marquess of Cambridge (1st creation), 1706
Prince George (1683–1760); Duke of Cambridge, etc. later King George II
Dukedom of Cambridge (3rd creation) and Marquessate of Cambridge (1st creation) merged with the Crown, 1727
Prince Frederick (1707–1751); Prince of Wales
George III (1738–1820)
Duke of Cambridge (4th creation), Earl of Tipperary and Baron Culloden (1st creation), 1801
Prince Edward (1767–1820); Duke of Kent and Strathearn	Prince Adolphus (1774–1850); 1st Duke of Cambridge, etc.
Queen Victoria (1819–1901)	Prince George (1819–1904); 2nd Duke of Cambridge, etc.	Princess Mary Adelaide of Cambridge (1833–1897)
Dukedom of Cambridge (4th creation), Earldom of Tipperary, and Barony Culloden (1st creation extinct, 1904
King Edward VII (1841–1910)
Marquess of Cambridge (2nd creation), Earl of Eltham (1st creation), and Viscount Northallerton, 1917
King George V (1865–1936)	Mary of Teck (1867–1953)	Adolphus Cambridge (1868–1927); Duke of Teck, 1st Marquess of Cambridge, etc.
King Edward VIII (1894–1972)	King George VI (1895–1952)	George Francis Hugh Cambridge (1895–1981); 2nd Marquess of Cambridge, etc.
Marquessate of Cambridge (2nd creation), Earldom of Eltham (2nd creation), Viscountcy Northallerton extinct, 1981
Queen Elizabeth II (1926–2022)
King Charles III (b. 1948)
Duke of Cambridge (5th creation), Earl of Strathearn (Mountbatten-Windsor line), and Baron Carrickfergus, 2011
Prince William (b. 1982); Prince of Wales, Duke of Cornwall, Duke of Rothesay, Duke of Cambridge, etc., Earl of Chester
Prince George of Wales (b. 2013)
Heir apparent to the Dukedom of Cambridge

== See also ==
- British royal family
- House of Hanover
- Duke of Cambridge
- Cambridge Bay, Nunavut
- Adolphustown, Ontario, Canada.

Prince Adolphus, Duke of Cambridge House of Hanover Cadet branch of the House of Welf Born: 24 February 1774 Died: 8 July 1850
Court offices
Preceded by General von Bülow as governor, with the Privy Council	Viceroy of Hanover; 1811–1837	Office abolished Ernest Augustus becomes resident monarch
Military offices
Preceded by The Duke of York and Albany	Colonel of the Coldstream Guards; 1805–1850	Succeeded by The Earl of Strafford
Academic offices
Preceded by The 1st Viscount Melville	Chancellor of the University of St Andrews; 1811–1814	Succeeded by The 2nd Viscount Melville
Other offices
Preceded by The Duke of York and Albany	President of the Foundling Hospital; 1827–1850	Succeeded by The Duke of Cambridge
Honorary titles
Preceded by Sir Thomas Maitland	Grand Master of the Order of St Michael and St George; 1825–1850	Succeeded by The Duke of Cambridge
Peerage of the United Kingdom
New creation	Duke of Cambridge; 4th creation 1801–1850	Succeeded by Prince George
