= Princess Caroline of Nassau-Usingen =

- Princess Frederick of Hesse-Kassel
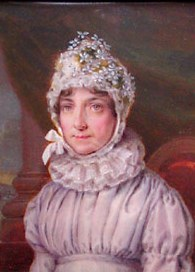
- Portrait, late 18th/early 19th century
- Born: 4 April 1762; Biebrich, Nassau-Usingen
- Died: 17 August 1823 (aged 61); Rumpenheim, Hesse-Kassel
- Spouse: Landgrave Frederick of Hesse-Cassel (m. 1786)
- Issue: Prince William of Hesse-Kassel; Karl Friedrich; Friedrich Wilhelm; Ludwig Karl; Georg Karl; Luise Karoline Marie Friederike; Marie, Grand Duchess of Mecklenburg-Strelitz; Princess Augusta, Duchess of Cambridge
Names
- German: Karoline Polyxena
- House: Nassau-Usingen
- Father: Karl Wilhelm, Prince of Nassau-Usingen
- Mother: Countess Caroline Felizitas of Leiningen-Dagsburg

Princess Caroline of Nassau-Usingen (German: Prinzessin Karoline Polyxena von Nassau-Usingen; 4 April 1762 – 17 August 1823) was the elder daughter of Karl Wilhelm, Prince of Nassau-Usingen, and wife of Landgrave Frederick of Hesse-Kassel.

== Early life ==
Caroline was born at Biebrich, Nassau-Usingen, the second child and first daughter of Karl Wilhelm, Prince of Nassau-Usingen, and his wife, Countess Caroline Felizitas of Leiningen-Dagsburg, daughter of Christian Karl Reinhard, Count of Leiningen-Dagsburg-Heidesheim.

Caroline, via her mother's roots among the Alsace lords of Leiningen, was a cousin of the Danish aristocrat, the Duke of Augustenborg, as both were direct descendants of the important Danish and Sleswicker magnate and statesman Frederik Ahlefeldt. This Danish connection played a role in Caroline's marriage.

== Marriage and family ==
Caroline married on 2 December 1786 in Biebrich to Landgrave Frederick of Hesse-Kassel, youngest child of Frederick II, Landgrave of Hesse-Kassel and Princess Mary of Great Britain, daughter of George II of Great Britain. The Landgrave and Prince Frederik was born a German (Hessian) aristocrat, a cadet son of a Landesfürstliche house, but had lived since his youth in Denmark, as had his two elder brothers. Frederik's two elder brothers married daughters of the deceased King of Norway and Denmark. However, there was no Danish royal daughter left to marry the youngest boy, Frederik, so he married a cousin of the Duke of Augustenborg, being Caroline of Nassau. Frederik was an infantry general in Danish service.

They had eight children:

- William (24 December 1787 – 5 September 1867), married Louise Charlotte of Denmark (1789–1864) and was the father of Louise of Hesse-Kassel (wife of Christian IX of Denmark).
- Karl Friedrich (9 March 1789 – 10 September 1802)
- Friedrich Wilhelm (24 April 1790 – 25 October 1876)
- Ludwig Karl (12 November 1791 – 12 May 1800)
- Georg Karl (14 January 1793 – 4 March 1881)
- Luise Karoline Marie Friederike (9 April 1794 – 16 March 1881)
- Marie Wilhelmine Friederike (21 January 1796 – 30 December 1880), married Georg, Grand Duke of Mecklenburg-Strelitz (1779–1860)
- Augusta Wilhelmine Luise (25 July 1797 – 6 April 1889), married Prince Adolphus, Duke of Cambridge (1774–1850) and was the maternal grandmother of Mary of Teck (wife of George V of the United Kingdom).

== Ancestry ==
Ancestors of Princess Caroline of Nassau-Usingen

8. William Henry, Prince of Nassau-Usingen
4. Charles, Prince of Nassau-Usingen
9. Princess Charlotte Amalie of Nassau-Dillenburg
2. Charles William, Prince of Nassau-Usingen
10. John William III, Duke of Saxe-Eisenach
5. Princess Christine Wilhelmine of Saxe-Eisenach
11. Magdalena Sibylla of Saxe-Weissenfels
1. Princess Caroline of Nassau-Usingen
12. Johann, Count of Leiningen-Dagsburg-Falkenburg
6. Christian Karl Reinhard of Leiningen-Dagsburg-Falkenburg
13. Countess Johanna Magdalene of Hanau-Lichtenberg
3. Countess Caroline Felizitas of Leiningen-Dagsburg
14. Count George Ludwig of Solms-Rödelheim
7. Countess Catharina Polyxena of Solms-Rödelheim and Assenheim
15. Countess Charlotte Sibylle of Ahlefeld

== Notes and sources ==
- L'Allemagne dynastique, Huberty, Giraud, Magdelaine, Reference: vol III page 427
- The Royal House of Stuart, London, 1969, 1971, 1976, Addington, A. C.
- Europäische Stammtafeln, Band I, Frank Baron Freytag von Loringhoven, 1975, Isenburg, W. K. Prinz von
