= Prince Frederick of Hesse-Kassel =

German noble (1747–1837)

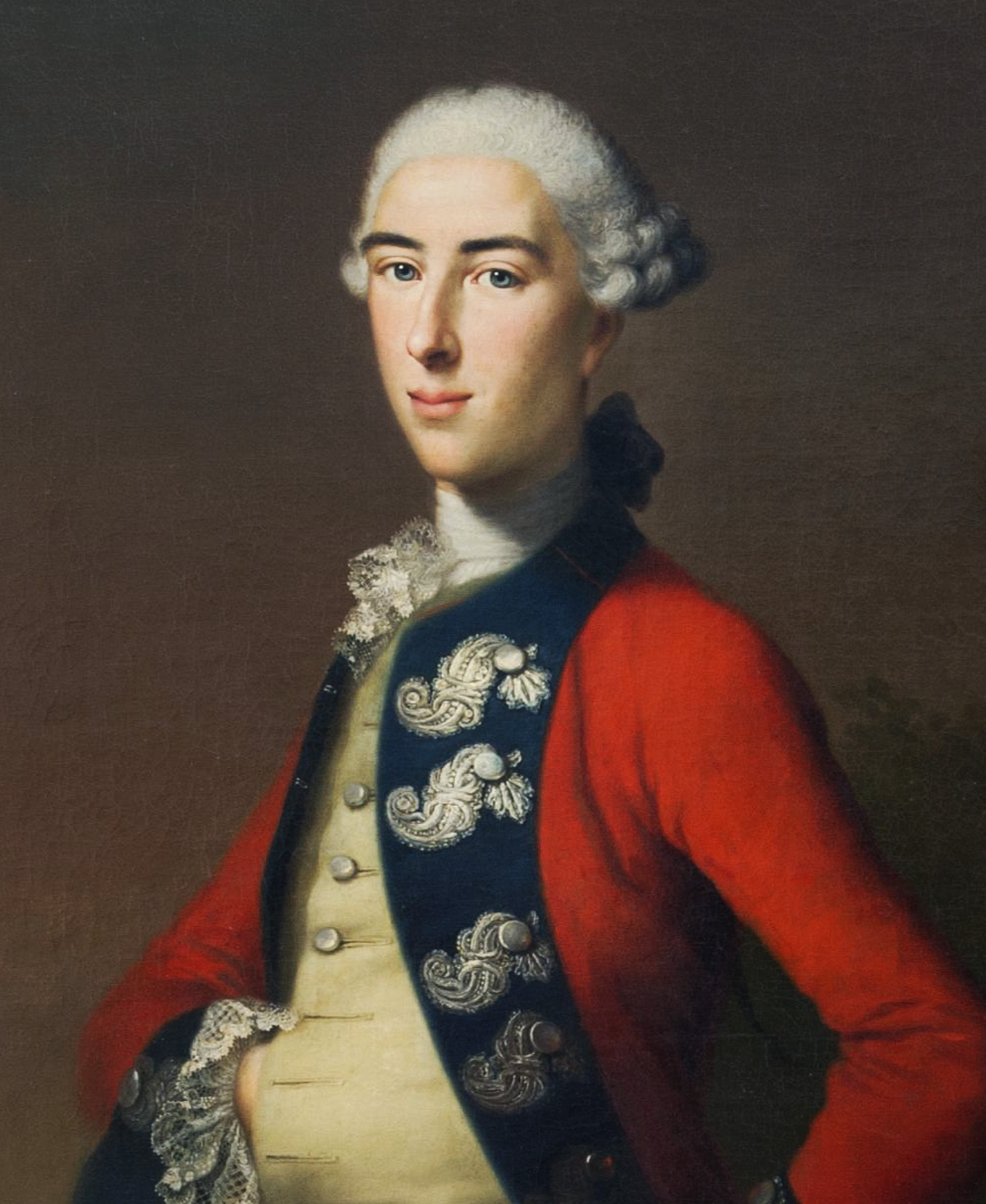
- Portrait by Carl Gustaf Pilo, c. 1765
- Born: 11 September 1747; Kassel
- Died: 20 May 1837 (aged 89); Rumpenheim Castle, Kassel
- Spouse: Princess Caroline of Nassau-Usingen (m. 1786; died 1823)
- Issue: Prince William; Prince Karl Friedrich; Prince Friedrich Wilhelm; Prince Ludwig Karl; Prince Georg Karl; Luise, Baroness George von der Decken; Marie, Grand Duchess of Mecklenburg-Strelitz; Princess Augusta, Duchess of Cambridge
- House: Hesse-Cassel
- Father: Frederick II, Landgrave of Hesse-Kassel
- Mother: Princess Mary of Great Britain

Prince Frederick of Hesse-Kassel (11 September 1747 – 20 May 1837) was a younger member of the ruling dynasty of the Landgraviate of Hesse-Kassel (or Hesse-Cassel) and a Danish general.

He was born as the youngest son of Hereditary Prince Frederick of Hesse-Kassel (the future Landgrave Frederick II) and Princess Mary of Great Britain. He was the last surviving legitimate grandchild of George II of Great Britain, dying one month before Queen Victoria (granddaughter of his first cousin King George III) ascended to the throne.

== Youth ==
His father, the then hereditary prince (who reigned from 1760 and died in 1785) had in 1747 left the family and soon converted to Catholicism, and in 1755 formally ended his marriage. The young prince Frederick, together with his two elder brothers, were with their mother the Landgravine Mary and became fostered by Protestant relatives in 1747. Soon the family moved to Denmark to be guests of her sister Louise of Great Britain, who died in 1751. His two elder brothers married Danish princesses - their first cousins - in 1763 and 1766 respectively. They remained in Denmark, becoming important lords and royal functionaries. Only his eldest brother returned to Kassel, in 1785 when ascending the landgraviate. In 1815, the prince was in command of the Royal Danish Auxiliary Corps mobilized as part of the Seventh Coalition against Napoleonic France.

== Marriage ==
On 2 December 1786 in Biebrich, he married Princess Caroline of Nassau-Usingen (4 April 1762 Biebrich - 17 August 1823 Offenbach), a remarkable heiress of a family which became extinct in male line. 1781 he bought Rumpenheim Castle, Offenbach, from his brother Carl, and it became the family's seat. He became known as Landgrave of Hesse-Kassel-Rumpenheim, and his descendants are known as the Hesse-Kassel-Rumpenheim branch of the House of Hesse, one of only two branches that survived to the present day.

== Children ==
- William (24 December 1787 – 5 September 1867), married Louise Charlotte of Denmark (1789–1864) and was the father of Louise of Hesse-Kassel (wife of Christian IX of Denmark).
- Karl Friedrich (9 March 1789 – 10 September 1802)
- Friedrich Wilhelm (24 April 1790 – 25 October 1876)
- Ludwig Karl (12 November 1791 – 12 May 1800)
- Georg Karl (14 January 1793 – 4 March 1881)
- Luise Karoline Marie Friederike (9 April 1794 – 16 March 1881), married Graf Georg von der Decken (1787–1859), King's Hanoverian General of the Cavalry (Germany)
- Marie Wilhelmine Friederike (21 January 1796 – 30 December 1880), married George, Grand Duke of Mecklenburg-Strelitz (1779–1860)
- Augusta Wilhelmine Luise (25 July 1797 – 6 April 1889), married Prince Adolphus, Duke of Cambridge (1774–1850) and was the maternal grandmother of Mary of Teck (wife of George V of the United Kingdom).

== Ancestry ==
Ancestors of Prince Frederick of Hesse-Kassel

8. Charles I, Landgrave of Hesse-Kassel
4. William VIII, Landgrave of Hesse-Kassel
9. Maria Amalia of Courland
2. Frederick II, Landgrave of Hesse-Kassel
10. Moritz Wilhelm, Duke of Saxe-Zeitz
5. Dorothea Wilhelmine of Saxe-Zeitz
11. Marie Amalie of Brandenburg
1. Landgrave Frederick of Hesse-Cassel
12. George I of Great Britain
6. George II of Great Britain
13. Sophia Dorothea of Celle
3. Princess Mary of Great Britain
14. John Frederick, Margrave of Brandenburg-Ansbach
7. Caroline of Ansbach
15. Eleanor Erdmuthe Louise of Saxe-Eisenach
