= Princess Mary of Great Britain =

Landgravine of Hesse-Kassel from 1760 to 1772

Mary of Great Britain
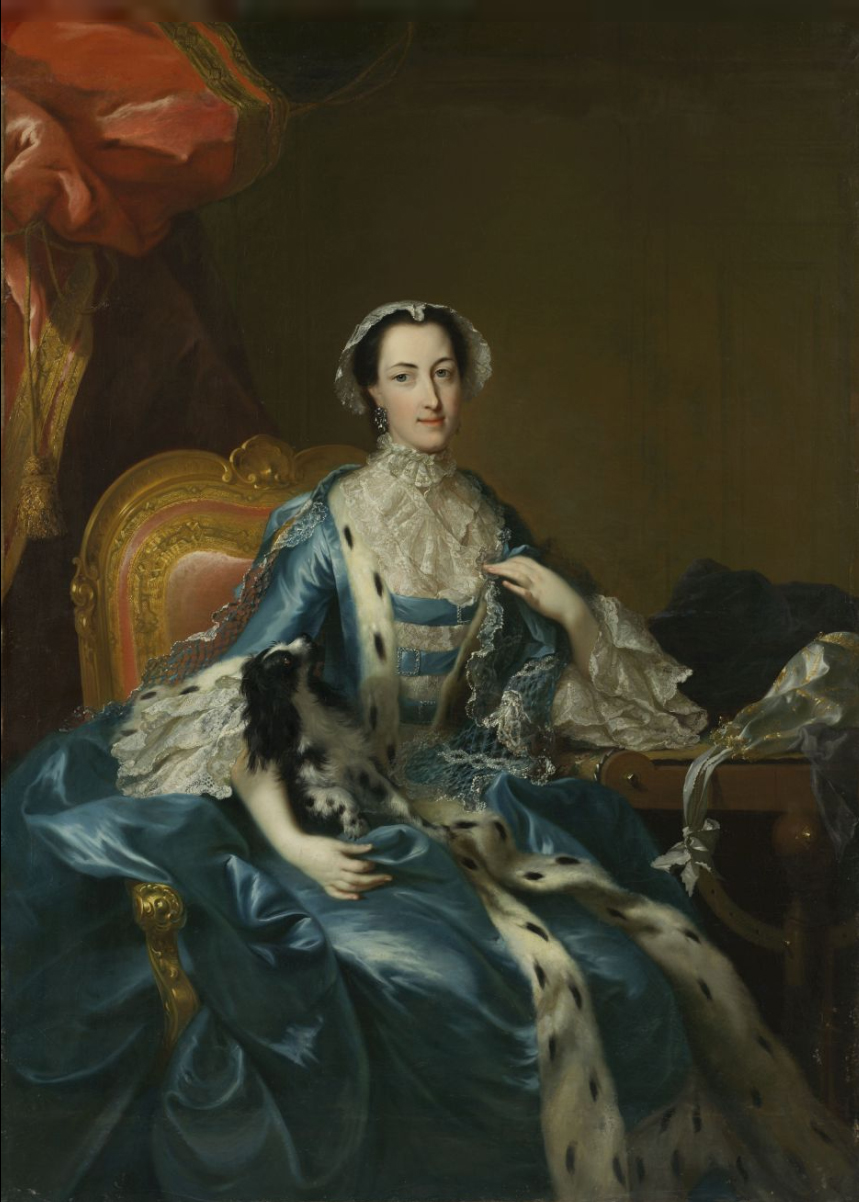
- Portrait by Johann Heinrich Tischbein, 1754.

Landgravine consort of Hesse-Kassel
- Tenure: 1 February 1760 – 14 January 1772
- Born: 5 March 1723 (New Style); Leicester House, London, England
- Died: 14 January 1772 (aged 48); Hanau, Holy Roman Empire
- Burial: 1 February 1772; Marienkirche, Hanau
- Spouse: Frederick II, Landgrave of Hesse-Kassel (m. 1740; sep. 1754)
- Issue: Prince William; William I, Elector of Hesse; Prince Charles; Prince Frederick
- House: Hanover
- Father: George II of Great Britain
- Mother: Caroline of Ansbach

Mary of Great Britain (5 March 1723 – 14 January 1772) was the second-youngest daughter of George II of Great Britain and his wife, Caroline of Ansbach, and Landgravine of Hesse-Kassel as the wife of Frederick II, Landgrave of Hesse-Kassel.

== Early life ==
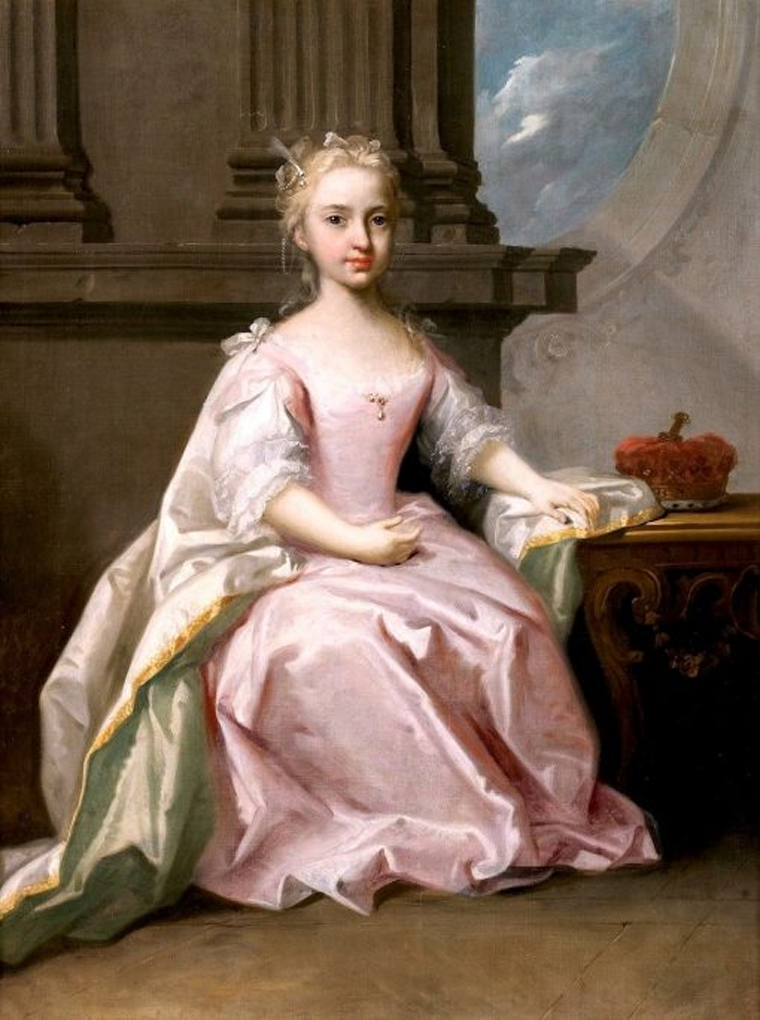
Princess Mary, by Jacopo Amigoni

Princess Mary was born at Leicester House, Westminster, London. Her father was the Prince of Wales, later King George II. Her mother was Caroline of Ansbach, daughter of Johann Friedrich, Margrave of Brandenburg-Ansbach.

Her father succeeded, as George II, on 11 June 1727, and she became "HRH The Princess Mary". Upon her death in 1737, her mother, Queen Caroline, entrusted Mary to her elder sister Caroline, urging her to "do what she could to support the meek and mild disposition of Princess Mary".

== Marriage ==
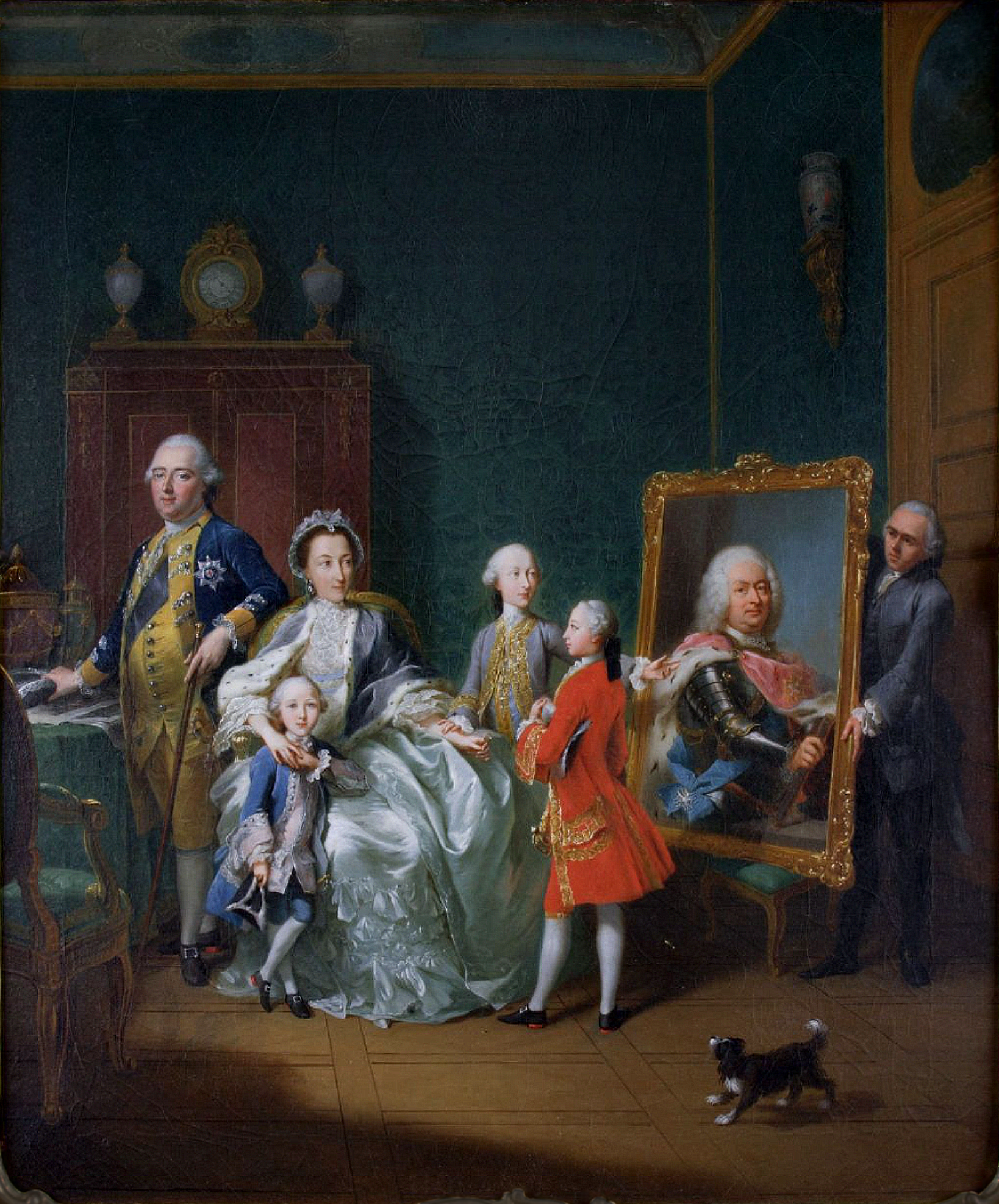
Mary as Hereditary Princess of Hesse-Kassel with her family in 1754. Painting by Johann Heinrich Tischbein.

A marriage was negotiated with Landgrave Frederick of Hesse-Kassel, the only son and heir of William VIII, Landgrave of Hesse-Kassel. For the marriage, Parliament voted Mary £40,000.

They married by proxy at the Chapel Royal of St. James's Palace in London on 8 May, then in person on 28 June 1740 at Bellevue Palace, Kassel. They had four sons, three of whom survived to adulthood.

The marriage was unhappy, and Frederick was said to be "brutal" and "a boor". Frederick reportedly subjected Mary to spousal abuse. In late 1746, Mary made an extended trip to Britain to escape his maltreatment. The couple separated in 1754 on Frederick's conversion to Roman Catholicism. She was supported by her father-in-law, who provided her with a residence in Hanau, as she did not wish to return to Great Britain, but to stay on the continent to raise her children.

In 1756, Mary moved to Denmark, to take care of the children of her sister Louise of Great Britain, who had died in 1751. She took her children with her, and they were raised at the royal court and her sons were married to Danish princesses. Her husband succeeded his father as Landgrave of Hesse-Kassel in 1760, and so Mary was technically Landgravine consort for the last twelve years of her life, despite her estrangement from her husband.

Mary died on 14 or 16 January 1772, aged 48 at Hanau, Germany.

== Archive Information ==
Mary's personal library and documents are preserved in the Archive of the House of Hesse, which is kept in Fasanerie Palace in Eichenzell, Hesse, Germany.

== Arms ==
On 30 August 1727, as a child of the sovereign, Mary was granted use of the arms of the realm, differenced by a label argent of three points, each bearing a canton gules.

== Issue ==
Name	Birth	Death	Notes
Prince William of Hesse-Kassel	25 December 1741	1 July 1742	died in infancy
William I, Elector of Hesse	3 June 1743	27 February 1821	married, 1763, Wilhelmina Caroline of Denmark; had issue
Prince Charles of Hesse-Kassel	19 December 1744	17 August 1836	married, 1766, Louise of Denmark; had issue
Prince Frederick of Hesse-Kassel	11 September 1747	20 May 1837	married, 1786, Caroline of Nassau-Usingen; had issue

== Ancestors ==
Ancestors of Princess Mary of Great Britain

8. Ernest Augustus, Elector of Hanover
4. George I of Great Britain
9. Princess Sophia of the Palatinate
2. George II of Great Britain
10. George William, Duke of Brunswick-Lüneburg
5. Duchess Sophia Dorothea of Brunswick-Celle
11. Éléonore Desmier d'Olbreuse
1. Princess Mary of Great Britain
12. Albert II, Margrave of Brandenburg-Ansbach
6. John Frederick, Margrave of Brandenburg-Ansbach
13. Countess Sophie Margarete of Oettingen-Oettingen
3. Princess Caroline of Brandenburg-Ansbach
14. John George I, Duke of Saxe-Eisenach
7. Princess Eleonore Erdmuthe of Saxe-Eisenach
15. Johannetta, Countess of Sayn-Altenkirchen

== Sources ==
- Rigg, James McMullen (1893). "Mary (1723-1772)" . In Lee, Sidney (ed.). Dictionary of National Biography. Vol. 36. London: Smith, Elder & Co.
- Weir, Alison (2008). Britain's Royal Families, The Complete Genealogy. London: Vintage Books. ISBN 978-0-09-953973-5.
- Williamson, David (2004). "Mary, Princess (1723–1772)". Oxford Dictionary of National Biography (online ed.). Oxford University Press. doi:10.1093/ref:odnb/18253. (Subscription, Wikipedia Library access or UK public library membership required.)

Princess Mary of Great Britain House of Hanover Cadet branch of the House of Welf Born: 5 March 1723 Died: 14 January 1772
German royalty
Vacant Title last held by Ulrika Eleonora of Sweden	Landgravine consort of Hesse-Kassel; 1 February 1760 – 14 January 1772	Vacant Title next held by Philippine of Brandenburg-Schwedt
