= Carl Friedrich Emil von Ibell =

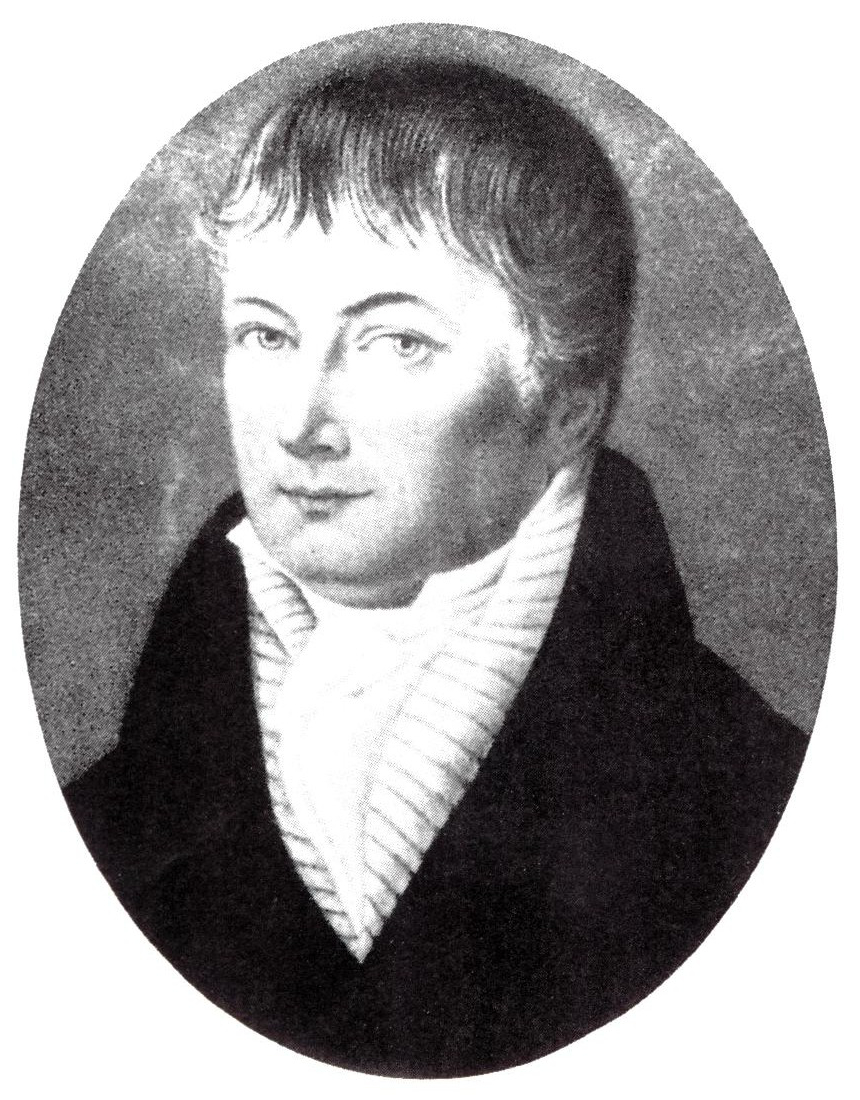
- Born: 29 October 1780; Wehen, Nassau-Usingen, Holy Roman Empire
- Died: 6 October 1834 (aged 53); Bad Homburg vor der Höhe, Hesse-Homburg, German Confederation
- Occupations: Political administrator Government president (Regierungspräsident)
- Spouse: Caroline Weis (1785-1873)
- Children: Karl von Ibell (1806-1847); Emma von Ibell / Koch (1807-1885); Dr. med Rudolf von Ibell (1814–1864)
- Parent(s): Karl Wilhelm Friedrich Ibell (1744-1826); Christiane Dorothea Franziska Schmidt (1756-1823)

Carl Friedrich Justus Emil von Ibell (29 October 1780 – 6 October 1834) was a senior government official (Amtmann) who famously survived an assassination attempt in 1819, and who ended up as president of the government in Hesse-Homburg which by this time was part of the German Confederation.

== Life ==
=== Family provenance ===
The Ibell family had originated in France, but they were Protestants, and so following the revocation of the Edict of Nantes in 1685 they left their homeland to build a new life in Germany.

Carl Ibell was his parents' only recorded son, and their fourth recorded child, born in the substantial hunting lodge at Wehen (today part of Taunusstein) near Wiesbaden which was the family home. His father, Karl Wilhelm Friedrich Ibell ("Der Amtmann Ibell") (1744-1826), had worked on behalf of the Prince since 1772 with administrative responsibilities for Wehen and seven surrounding villages. His mother was born Christiane Dorothea Franziska Schmidt (1756-1823), the only daughter of Karl Ludwig Schmidt (1719-1756) who had, as a young man, been employed as a tutor at the court of Nassau-Usingen where his pupils had included Frederick Augustus, Duke of Nassau.

=== Early years ===
Ibell was a delicate child, and for much of the time during his first nine years he was ill, after which his health improved, much to his parents' relief. Initially educated by his parents, from 1790 he was taught by his great uncle (by marriage), the Protestant pastor Jakob Ludwig Schellenberg, in Bierstadt. Between 1793 and 1797 he attended the secondary school in nearby Idstein which his father had attended before him. Here he was able to live with a friend of his father's who was a physician. At school the boy excelled academically. After this he went away to university, studying Jurisprudence at Göttingen from 1798 till 1801, just as his father had done a generation earlier. Two of his more memorable teachers at Göttingen were Johann Stephan Pütter (Law) and Georg Christoph Lichtenberg (Natural Sciences), both of whom were old enough to remember his father's time as a student, which led them to welcome the son with particular warmth, although Professor Lichtenberg died in 1799. In 1801 Carl Ibell received his practicing certificate. His university studies also took in natural sciences along with historical, archaeological, philosophical and language studies.

=== Government service in Nassau-Usingen ===
In 1802 he accompanied the president of the government of Nassau-Usingen, Karl Friedrich von Kruse on a trip to Regensburg, as a private secretary for a meeting with an imperial deputation ("Reichsdeputation"). The meeting concerned the reallocation of territories within the Holy Roman Empire following the allocation by Napoleon of the Left Bank of the Rhine, an issue which was of great importance for Nassau-Usingen. Ibell sufficiently impressed von Kruse to be appointed official secretary to the entire Nassau-Usingen delegation and later, when the president needed to be away from Regensburg while the talks dragged on, it fell to Ibell to become the delegation's leader. Apart from brief and rushed trips home, Ibell remained in Regensburg at least till June 1803. Back home, in 1804 he was offered the chance to enter government service at the court in Wiesbaden. His father, in the end, served as a contented (if not particularly well paid) and by all accounts highly effective senior district official based at Wehen for forty-two years, but for the son a career on the national level was chosen.

Between 1804 and 1815 he held a succession of influential posts at the heart of government as an administrative lawyer ("Verwaltungsjurist"). In terms of official job grades, the principal promotions he underwent during this period were to "Regierungsrat (Senior government officer)" in 1805, "Geheim Regierungsrat" (Privy senior government officer)" in 1809 and "Geheimrat" (privy councillor) in 1812. In 1815 Carl Friedrich Justus Emil Ibell was appointed "Regierungspräsident" (President of the government) of Nassau-Usingen and nominated as a member of the State Council. The position of "Regierungspräsident" made him one of the three most powerful men in the state.

Towards the end of his time at Göttingen Ibell had studied closely both The Wealth of Nations by Adam Smith and Traité d'économie politique by Jean-Baptiste Say, in both cases insisting on studying the works in their original language due to the inadequacy of the available translations. In terms of the contemporary political and economic context, he was uncompromising in his promotion of economic liberalism. His studies had left him with a particular expertise in matters concerning government finance and taxation. He was centrally involved in the abolition of serfdom and forced labour (1808), the tax code of February 1809, celebrated at the time as the "simplest and most expedient" and abolishing the tax collection privileges of the aristocracy. He was responsible for the Free Movement Law (Freizügigkeitsgesetz 1810) as a result of which each citizen of Nassau could choose freely where he would live. He also pushed through the abolition of various old laws that inhibited trade and ended internal tolls on the waterways.

Ibell was closely involved, together with von Bieberstein and Stein, in drafting the Nassau Constitution of 1814. The document was widely welcomed by liberals and progressives as the first modern written constitution to appear anywhere in the territories defined by what had been, till 1806, the Holy Roman Empire. His "Schools Edict" of 24 March 1817, which reflected a lifelong commitment to education, provided a structure for basic schooling and made school attendance compulsory. Later, in 1817, he was also closely involved in discussions leading up to the merger between the Lutheran and Reformed Protestant churches in Nassau, which was finally enshrined in an edict of 8 April 1818 which provided for a closer relationship between the liturgies of the hitherto separate churches, and set down principals for the regulation of church property.

Ibell's success as a statesman attracted gratitude from his prince who in 1817 or 1818 gave Ibell an estate at Unterliederbach (today a quarter of Frankfurt am Main) which included a manor house originally built in 1755/56 by a man called Stembler. The house and park survive to this day, known as the Villa Graubner (which respects a subsequent further change in ownership). Despite this very public mark of appreciation, Ibell's uncompromising commitment to economic and social liberalism was beginning to cause unease among members of the landed classes who saw some of their own privileges threatened by principles underlying the new Constitution.

On 1 July 1819 President Ibell received a visit at his home from a 28-year-old pharmacist called Karl Löning. The visit was unusual both because the man arrived without any advance notice, and because he arrived before mid-day. Löning's appearance was distracted and unconventional. Ibell nevertheless invited him in and they sat down to talk. Shortly after this Löning produced a dagger and stabbed Ibell. Ibell was able to deflect the blade, so that while he ended up bleeding badly, he suffered no lasting physical damage. A struggle ensued and after they ended up on the floor Ibell was able to hold Löning still for long enough to be able to call for help. Eventually his wife heard his calls for help and attempted to disarm the attacker. After this failed she too called for help. Eventually more people arrived, including Ibell's fifteen-year-old son, and the men were able to remove Löning. It turned out that Karl Löning was connected with the Gießen Blacks, a radical republican student fraternity. Along with Karl Ludwig Sand's assassination of August von Kotzebue, Löning's attempted murder of Ibell was one of the incidents that spurred the Federal Assembly's passage on September 20, 1819 of the Carlsbad Decrees, an essentially reactionary set of legislative measures that banned nationalist fraternities ("Burschenschaften"), removed liberal university professors, and extended press censorship. The measures were a long way from the liberal principles espoused by Ibell himself. The incident left Ibell deeply shaken and in 1820 he retired into private life. There are also indications that an end to Ibell's political career was triggered both by the reactionary currents that set in more generally and by increasingly stark differences with his prince on the interpretation of the constitution, notably as to whether the prince held his property on behalf of the state or on behalf of himself.

=== Government service in Hesse-Homburg ===
When Ibell retired from public service in 1820 he was aged just 40: his reputation for administrative and economic competence were intact. Six years later he entered the service of a neighbouring ruler, Frederick VI of Hesse-Homburg. Frederick almost immediately died, and was succeeded by his brother. Ibell served as leader of the government ("Regierungspräsident") of Hesse Homburg between 1828 and 1832. He is credited with having stabilised national finances and restoring a measure of confidence to the agricultural economy. Louis William proved more enthusiastic about the liberal agenda than his brother had been, and Ibell was able to push through major reforms of the justice system and of the schools system.

For Unterliederbach, Ibell funded and set up a progressive school for young people hitherto deprived of schooling in 1831. The curriculum included arithmetic, calligraphy, written composition and geodetics.

The constantly shifting complexities of relationships between Prussia and the lesser states in the "German confederation" (which had been created in 1815 to try and fill the vacuum left by the demise of the Holy Roman Empire) are beyond the scope of an essay on Carl Friedrich Ibell; but the Prussian king's interest in the German states on the Rhineland region went back a long way. In 1793 Frederick William, at that time the Prussian Crown Prince, was an honoured guest when he stayed with "Amtmann von Ibell" at the family's castle-home in Wehen while he was engaged in the successful recapture from the French of their city stronghold at nearby Mainz. Twenty years later, following the defining military success of the Battle of Leipzig, the Prussian king, as he had now become, attended a conference of his victorious generals in Frankfurt am Main and asked one of his commanders if old Ibell was still alive (Note: "Lebt mein alter Wirth, der Amtmann Ibell noch?") Told that Ibell's father was indeed still alive, the king sent warm greetings (Note: "Grüssen Sie herzlich meinen alten braven Wirth! Es möge ihm fortwährend wohl gehen!") and reminisced happily about the time he had spent at the family home. By 1830 old Karl Wilhelm Friedrich Ibell was dead, but his son was raised in that year to the rank of a Prussian aristocrat in recognition of his early and practical commitment to precursors of the German customs union. One effect of this is that sources after 1830 insert the prefix "von" before his family name.

In 1832 he fell seriously ill and withdrew from his office. Two years later he felt well enough to attempt a return to work, representing Hesse-Homburg at a ministerial conference at Vienna which Metternich had convoked, as a response to the upheavals of 1830, in order to impose an anti-democratic constitution across the German confederation. Ibell was quickly forced by his illness to return home to his home in Unterliederbach where he died a few weeks later.
