= Adolph, Count of Ottweiler =

Russian nobleman

Adolph Louis, Count of Ottweiler
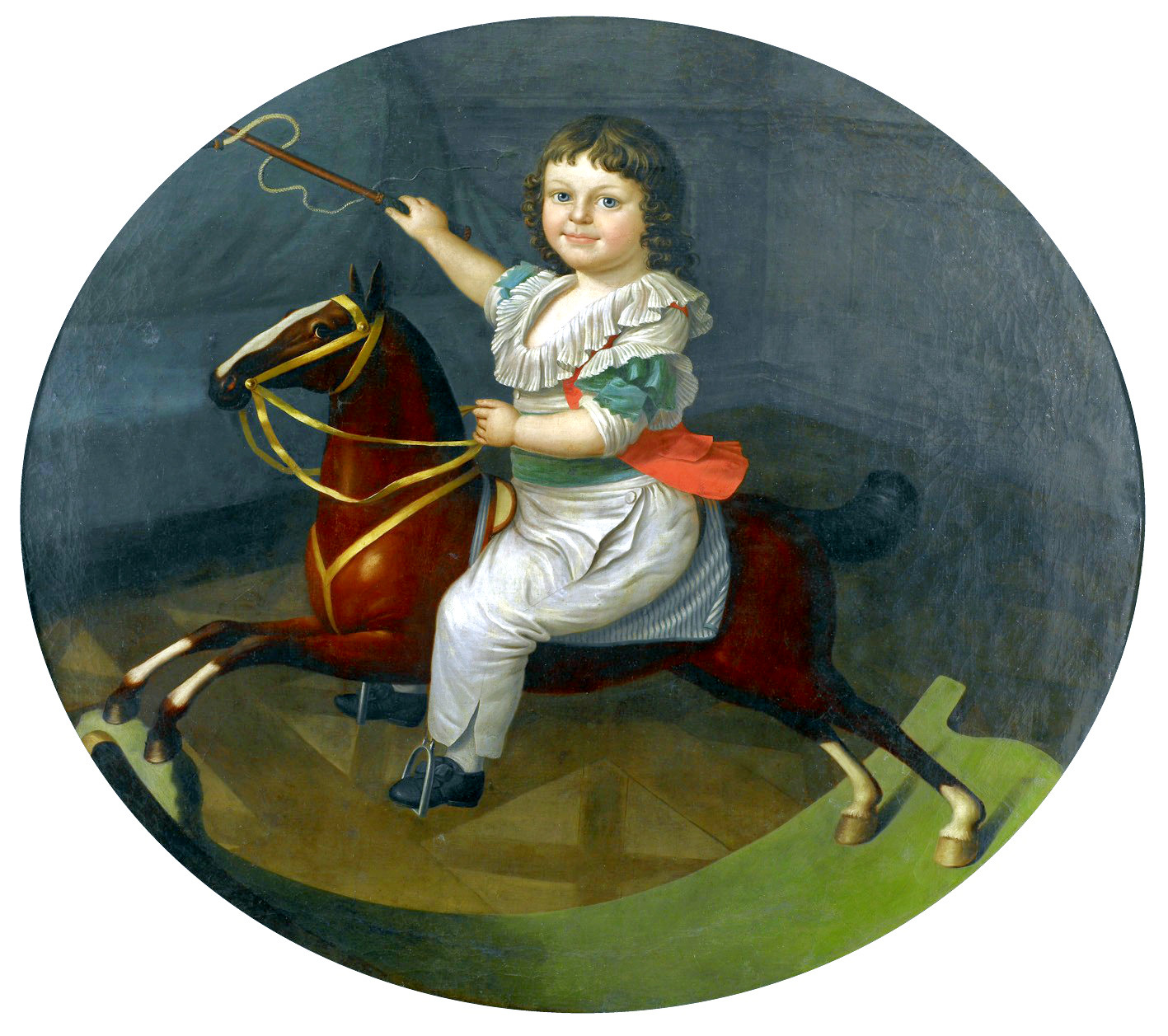
- Childhood portrait by Johann Friedrich Dryander
- Born: 3 June 1789; Saarbrücken Castle
- Died: 10 December 1812 (aged 23); Vilnius, Russian Empire
- Noble family: House of Nassau
- Father: Louis, Prince of Nassau-Saarbrücken
- Mother: Katharina Kest, Countess of Ottweiler and Duchess de Dillange

Adolf Ludwig Karl Moritz, Count of Ottweiler (3 June 1789 in Saarbrücken, Nassau-Saarbrücken - 10 December 1812 in Vilnius, Russian Empire), was a member of the Princely House of Nassau-Saarbrücken, Count of Ottweiler, and a Lieutenant in the Army of Württemberg. He died as a volunteer in the Russian campaign.

== Family ==
After the death of his first wife, Prince Louis of Nassau-Saarbrücken married on February 28, 1787 Catherine Kest, former handmaiden of his past mistress Baroness Amalie of Dorsberg. Of middle-class origin, he had been his mistress from 1774. He had her raised in 1774 to the peer status of "Lady of Ludwigsberg", in 1781 to Baroness and then in 1784 to "Countess of Ottweiler". To the opposition of the rest of the House of Nassau, Louis had coat of arms ceremoniously conferred upon Catherine, along with the title "Princess of Nassau-Saarbrücken". From their morganatic relationship before 1787 was born six children. Adolph, the seventh, was born their only legitimate child. Prior that year, in April 1789, Prince Louis acquired for her the Duchy of Dillange from King Louis XVI of France. As such, the Saarbrücken baptismal record for Adolph reads "Prince of Nassau and Duke of Dillingen".

The Principality of Nassau-Saarbrücken was occupied by French revolutionary troops during the First Coalition War in 1793, and incorporated into the French Republic. The princely family moved to Mannheim and then to Aschaffenburg, where Prince Louis died in exile in 1794. The Hereditary Prince Henry Louis followed him in 1797, leaving no offspring. Only eight years old, Adolph, while the last male survivor of the Nassau-Saarbrücken line, could not inherit the principality, as stipulated in the 30 June, 1783 Nassau Family Pact. Thus the pretension to the principality fell to Charles William, Prince of Nassau-Usingen, his father's cousin. Duchess Catherine and her son resided in Paris from 1802-5. There she attempted to regain their Revolutionary-controlled territories.

Childhood portraits of Adolph are located in the Old Collection of the Saarland Museum in Saarbrücken.

== Education ==
In Paris, Adolph studied a Classical education and fencing under a private tutor. At 16, he attended the University of Heidelberg, studying cameralism. He was very active in Heidelberg student life and was initially a member of the duelling fraternity Palatia Corps, and then on 25 November, 1805 a member of the Corps Suevia. By March 1807, he had joined the Corps Rhenania and challenged Georg Kloss, member of the Corp Suevia to two games in early 1808. After several university penalties, he received on August 13, 1808 the consilium abeundi. He thus transferred to the University of Göttingen, where he joined George Kloss as co-founder and senior of the Corps Hannovera. He received a suspension in 1809 in the course of the Police Affair, in which many Göttingen students clashed with the police of the Kingdom of Westphalia on 17 August, 1809. From his mother's residence at Mannheim, he continued to correspond with the officially defunct Hannoverians. He continued studies during the summer semester of 1810 at the University of Jena. By winter 1810, he was studying at the University of Erlangen. He joined the Corps Onoldia in November and from January 1811 to his departure in March 1811, he was Consenior of the fraternity.

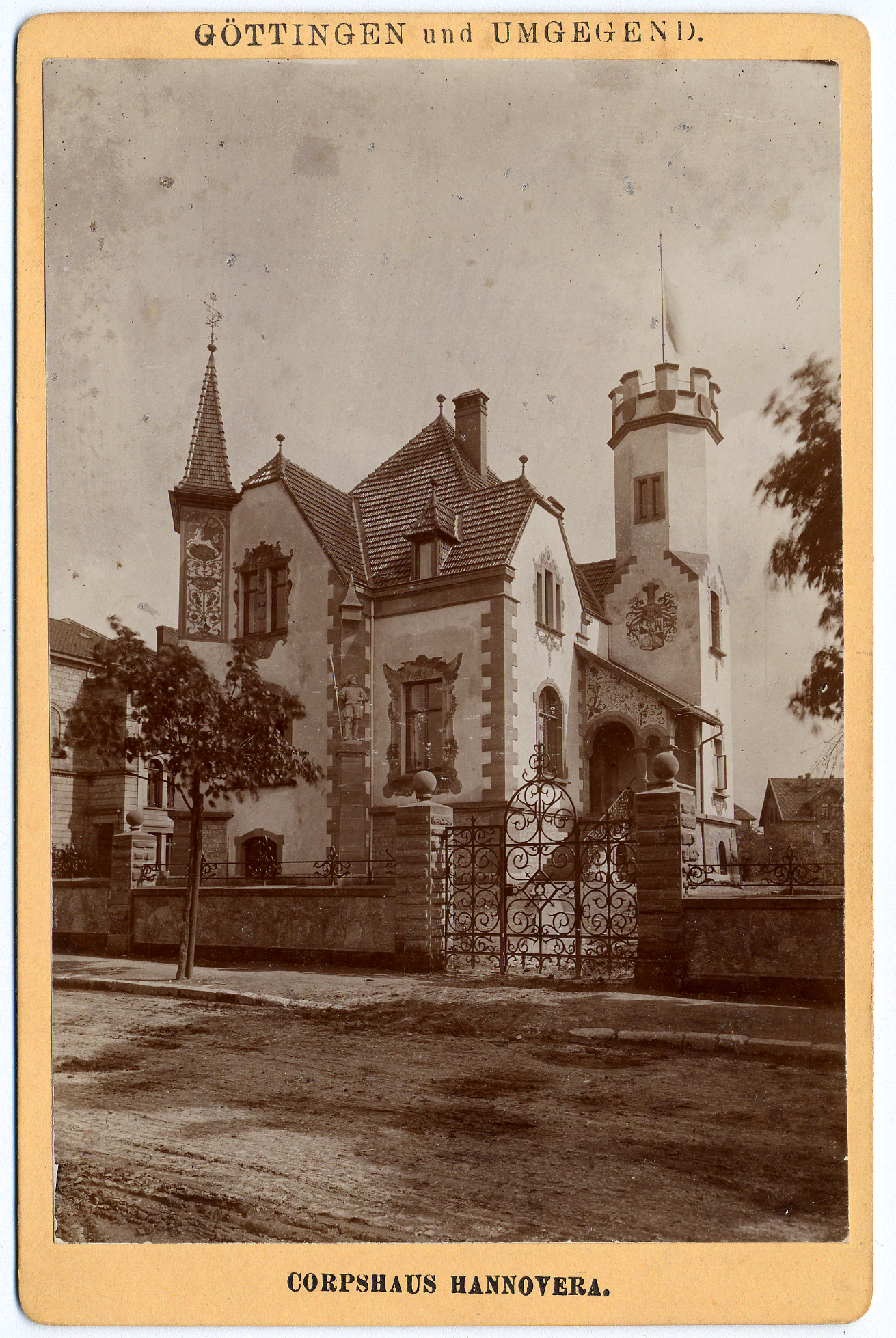
The Corpshaus Hannovera, where Adolph resided as founder of the fraternity

== Military career ==
In March 1811 he joined as a cadet in the army of the Kingdom of Württemberg and first attended the Military Academy in Ludwigsburg. In August 1811 he was promoted to Second Lieutenant of the "Foot Guards" and on February 19, 1812 promoted to Lieutenant of the so-called "König" Jager Battalion. In March he volunteered to Napoleon's Invasion of Russia. On 16 August 1812, during the Battle of Smolensk he was severely wounded by a shot to the shoulder. The ball could be removed after about forty days. He arrived by ambulance on December 9, 1812 to Vilna, where in front of the Gate of Dawn he was run over by a cannon. In temperatures as low as -39 degrees, he was brought to the house of Rabbi Aron, where died of his injuries and frostbite the following night. With his death, the family of Nassau-Saarbrücken was extinguished in the male line; He was survived by his mother, two married sisters, wife and daughter. His mother the Duchess Catherine refused to acknowledge his death for years to come. Only when many years later the Tsar invited her to his court in Moscow to inform her that his imperially-ordered investigation had turned up a grave, she resigned herself to the truth.

== Ancestors ==
Ancestors of Adolph, Count of Ottweiler

16. Walrad, Prince of Nassau-Usingen
8. William Henry, Prince of Nassau-Usingen
17. Catherine Françoise de Croÿ-Roeulx
4. William Henry, Prince of Nassau-Saarbrücken
18. Henry, Prince of Nassau-Dillenburg
9. Charlotte Amalia of Nassau-Dillenburg
19. Dorothea Elisabeth of Brieg
2. Louis, Prince of Nassau-Saarbrücken
20. George Albert II of Erbach-Fürstenau
10. George William of Erbach
21. Anna Dorothea Christina of Hohenlohe-Waldenburg
5. Princess Sophie of Erbach-Erbach
22. John Caspar of Bothmer
11. Sophia Charlotte of Bothmer
23. Gisela Erdmuthe of Hoym
1. Adolphe, Prince of Nassau-Saarbrücken
24. Wendel Kest
12. Johann Peter Kest
25. Gertrud Weber
6. Johann Georg Kest
26. Johannes Klein
13. Anna Elisabeth Klein
27. Anna Katharina ?
3. Katherine, Duchess of Dillange
28. Johann Nikolaus Wohlfahrt
14. Johann Christoffel Wohlfahrt
29. Katharina ?
7. Anna Barbara Wohlfahrt
30. ? Wagner
15. Anna Gertruda Wagner
31. ?

Adolph, Count of Ottweiler House of Nassau Born: 3 June 1789 Died: 10 December 1812
Preceded by Karl Philipp	Count of Weilnau; 1789-1812	Succeeded by Athénaïs
