= Karl Philipp of Nassau-Usingen =

Karl Philipp, Count of Weilnau
- Born: 25 March 1746; Biebrich
- Died: 15 August 1789 (aged 43); Wiesbaden
- Noble family: House of Nassau
- Father: Charles, Prince of Nassau-Usingen
- Mother: Baroness Maria Magdalena of Biebrich

Karl Philipp of Weilnau (25 March 1746, in Biebrich – 15 August 1789, in Wiesbaden), was the first Count of Weilnau, and a Captain in the Holy Roman Imperial Army.

== Family ==
Karl Philipp was the son of Charles of Nassau-Usingen and Baroness Margareth Maria Magdalena von Biebrich, a title newly created for her.

His father married for the second time the daughter of the mayor of Wiesbaden, Margareth Maria Magdalena Groß (born February 26, 1714). Because she had no title, and the marriage would be considered morganatic, he asked Emperor Joseph II to create the Barony of Biebrich. Maria Magdalena and her children Philippa Catherine (1744) and Karl Philipp (1746) were designated Barons of Biebrich.

In June 1773, his sister Philippa Catherine married Baron Karl Friedrich von Kruse (1738–1806) in the Schloss Biebrich. He would later become the Prime Minister of the Principality of Nassau-Usingen in December 1768. The next year, Prince Charles promoted him to President of All the Schools and Director of the Court Chamber.

The Nassau Family Pact was implemented in 1783 by the other six adult members of the House, but Karl Philipp, who was 37, was not invited to be a signatory because of his parents' marriage, which they considered to be morganatic.

Karl Philipp of Nassau-Usingen House of Nassau Born: 25 March 1746 Died: 15 August 1789
Preceded by New title	Count of Weilnau; 1770-1789	Succeeded by Adolf
