= Frederick Augustus, Duke of Nassau =

Frederick Augustus
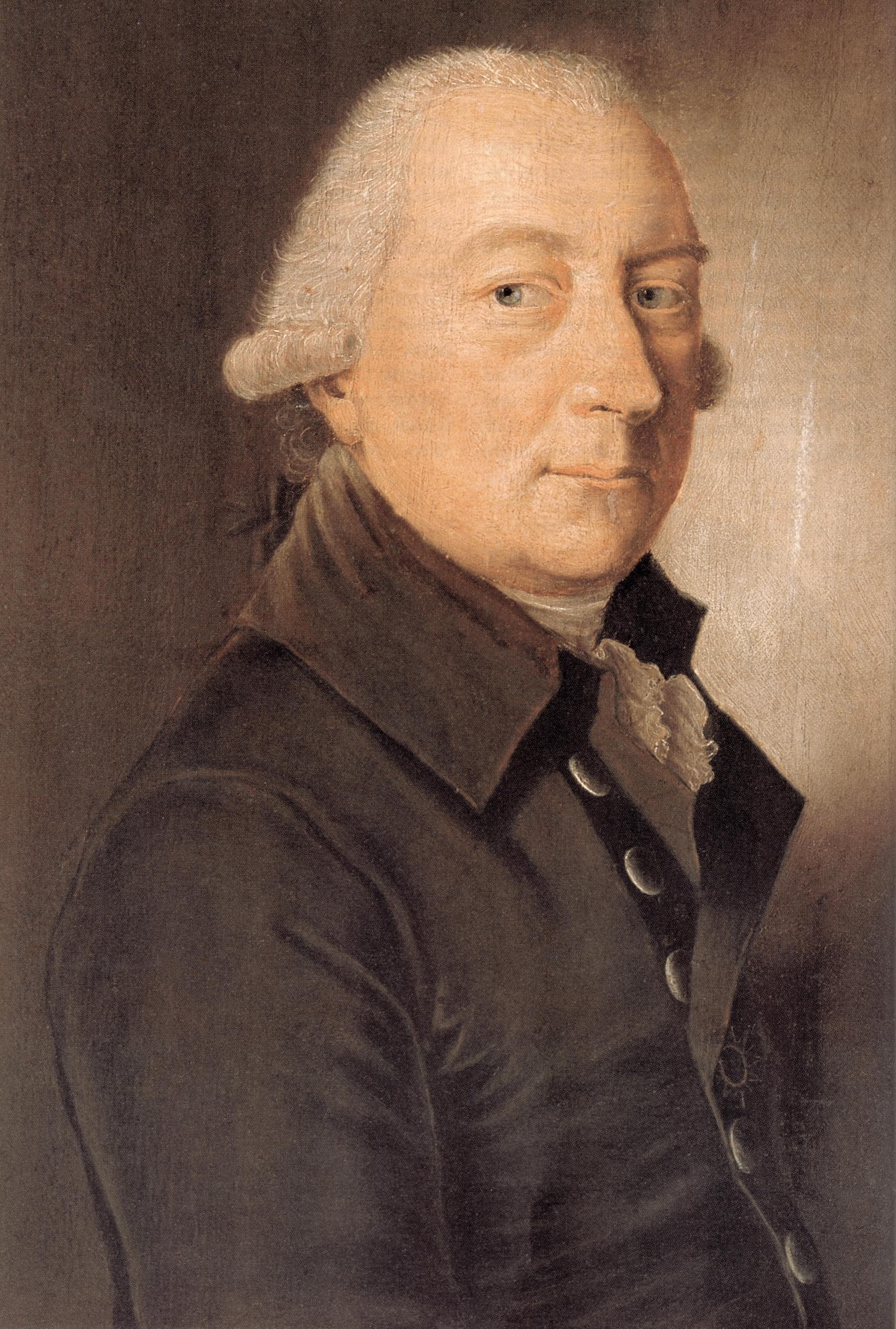
- Frederick Augusts, Duke of Nassau

Duke of Nassau
- Reign: 30 August 1806 – 24 March 1816
- Predecessor: None. New Title
- Successor: William

Prince of Nassau-Usingen
- Reign: 17 May 1803 – 24 March 1816
- Predecessor: Charles William
- Successor: None. Incorporated into the Duchy of Nassau
- Born: 23 April 1738; Usingen, Principality of Nassau-Usingen
- Died: 24 March 1816 (aged 77); Schloss Biebrich, Wiesbaden, Duchy of Nassau
- Spouse: Princess Luise of Waldeck and Pyrmont
- Issue: Princess Christiane Luise; Princess Karoline Friederike; Princess Augusta; Prince Friedrich Wilhelm; Princess Lousie Maria; Princess Friederike Victoria; Prince Frederick Charles
Names
- Friedrich August
- House: House of Nassau-Usingen
- Father: Charles, Prince of Nassau-Usingen
- Mother: Princess Christiane Wilhelmine of Saxe-Eisenach
- Religion: Calvinism

Friedrich August, Duke of Nassau, Prince of Nassau-Usingen (23 April 1738 in Usingen – 24 March 1816 in Wiesbaden) was the last Prince of Nassau-Usingen and, jointly with his cousin, Friedrich Wilhelm of Nassau-Weilburg, first Duke of Nassau. He died without surviving male issue and was succeeded by his cousin's son, Wilhelm.

== Biography ==
=== Early life ===
Friedrich August, born in Usingen, was a younger son of Prince Charles of Nassau-Usingen and Princess Christine Wilhelmine of Saxe-Eisenach (daughter of John William III, Duke of Saxe-Eisenach). From 1744, he lived with his parents in Schloss Biebrich in Wiesbaden. He followed a military career in the army of the Holy Roman Empire and served in the Seven Years' War. In 1790, he became a Field Marshal.

=== Ruler of Nassau ===
On 17 May 1803, he succeeded as the Prince of Nassau-Usingen when his elder brother, Charles William, died without male heirs. On 6 July 1806, he joined the Confederation of the Rhine in order to prevent Napoleon from annexing the principality. Shortly thereafter, on 30 August 1806, he agreed with his cousin Friedrich Wilhelm of Nassau-Weilburg that their territories should be united into a single Duchy of Nassau with Frederick Augustus as the first duke and Frederick William as co-ruler. Since Friedrich August's sons had died young, it was also agreed that the combined duchy and sole rulership would pass to the heir of the Nassau-Weilburg line.

After Napoleon's defeat at the Battle of Leipzig, Friedrich August joined in the allies fighting against the French emperor. Nassau's troops fought under the command of Arthur Wellesley, 1st Duke of Wellington at the Battle of Waterloo. At the Congress of Vienna, the unification of the Duchy of Nassau was approved and the duchy joined the German Confederation.

Friedrich August was an enlightened and liberal ruler who established reforms such as the elimination of tax privileges for the nobility, the introduction of press freedom and the constitution for a modern state. His court at the Biebrich Castle was praised by visitors for its serenity and hospitality.

=== Marriage and children ===
On 9 June 1775, Friedrich August married Princess Luise of Waldeck and Pyrmont (born 29 January 1751 in Arolsen, died 17 November 1816 in Frankfurt am Main), daughter of Karl August, Prince of Waldeck and Pyrmont and Countess Palatine Christiane Henriette of Zweibrücken-Birkenfeld. The couple had seven children (5 daughters and 2 sons), but only their daughters survived infancy.

- Christiane Luise (Biebrich, 16 August 1776 - Karlsruhe, 19 February 1829). Married on 29 November 1791 to Margrave Friedrich of Baden (29 August 1756 - 28 May 1817), son of Grand Duke Karl Friedrich of Baden.
- Karoline Friederike (Usingen, 30 August 1777 - Hochheim am Main, 28 August 1821). Married on 9 February 1792 to Christian August, Duke of Anhalt-Köthen (18 November 1769 - 5 May 1812), divorced 1803.
- Augusta (Usingen, 30 December 1778 - Wildbad, 16 July 1846). First married on 2 August 1804 to Ludwig of Hesse-Homburg (29 August 1770 - 29 January 1839) son of Frederick V, Landgrave of Hesse-Homburg, divorced 1805. Married secondly on 7 September 1807 to Friedrich Wilhelm von Bismarck (28 July 1783 - 18 July 1860).
- Friedrich Wilhelm (Biebrich, 30 July 1780 - Biebrich, 18 August 1780).
- Luise Maria (Usingen, 18 July 1782 - Biebrich, 27 June 1812).
- Friederike Victoria (Usingen 21 February 1784 - Hannover, 18 July 1822), married to Count Ludwig Heinrich Klaus von Burgund.
- Friedrich Karl (Usingen, 17 June 1787 - Frankfurt am Main, 29 September 1787)

== Ancestry ==
Ancestors of Frederick Augustus, Duke of Nassau

8. Walrad, Prince of Nassau-Usingen
4. William Henry, Prince of Nassau-Usingen
9. Catherine Françoise, comtesse de Croÿ-Roeulx
2. Charles, Prince of Nassau-Usingen
10. Henry, Prince of Nassau-Dillenburg
5. Countess Charlotte Amalie of Nassau-Dillenburg
11. Princess Dorothea Elisabeth of Brieg
1. Frederick Augustus, Duke of Nassau
12. John George I, Duke of Saxe-Eisenach
6. John William III, Duke of Saxe-Eisenach
13. Johannetta, Countess of Sayn-Altenkirchen
3. Princess Christine Wilhelmine of Saxe-Eisenach
14. Johann Adolf I, Duke of Saxe-Weissenfels
7. Princess Magdalena Sibylla of Saxe-Weissenfels
15. Princess Johanna Magdalena of Saxe-Altenburg

Frederick Augustus, Duke of Nassau House of Nassau-Usingen Cadet branch of the House of Nassau Born: April 23 1738 Died: March 24 1816
Regnal titles
Preceded by Charles William	Prince of Nassau-Usingen; 1803–1806	Principality incorporated into the Duchy of Nassau
Duchy created by merger of Nassau-Usingen and Nassau-Weilburg	Duke of Nassau; 1806–1816	Succeeded by William
