= Charles, Prince of Nassau-Usingen =

Prince of Nassau-Usingen (1718–1775)

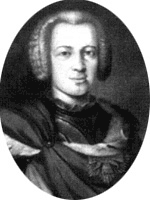
- Charles, Prince of Nassau-Usingen
- Born: 31 December 1712; Usingen
- Died: 21 June 1775 (aged 62); Biebrich
- Noble family: House of Nassau
- Spouse: Princess Christine Wilhelmine of Saxe-Eisenach
- Issue: Charles William, Prince of Nassau-Usingen; Frederick Augustus, Duke of Nassau; John Adolph of Nassau-Usingen; Karl Philipp of Nassau-Usingen
- Father: William Henry, Prince of Nassau-Usingen
- Mother: Countess Charlotte Amalia of Nassau-Dillenburg

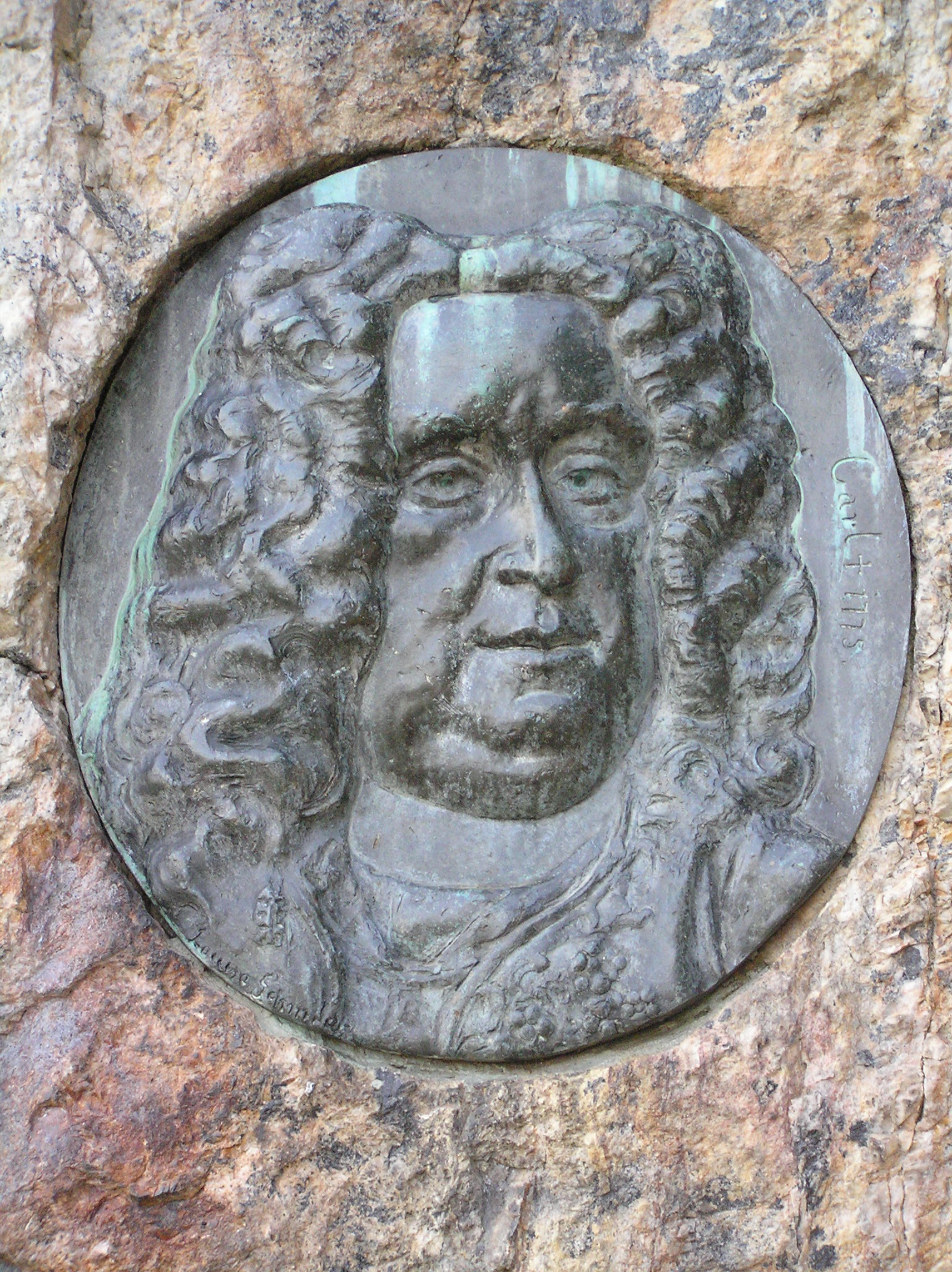
Memorial for Charles in the Castle Park in Usingen

Charles, Prince of Nassau-Usingen (31 December 1712 – 21 June 1775), was Prince of Nassau-Usingen.

== Family ==
Charles was born in Usingen, the son of William Henry of Nassau-Usingen and Countess Charlotte Amalia of Nassau-Dillenburg.

After Charles' father died in 1718, Charlotte Amalia acted as regent for both Charles and his younger brother William Henry II. In 1728, Charles inherited the counties of Nassau-Ottweiler, Nassau-Idstein and Nassau-Saarbrücken from his second cousin Frederick Louis. These counties were then added to his county of Nassau-Usingen.

In 1734, he was declared an adult by Emperor Charles VI. In 1735, he and William Henry II divided their inheritance. Charles received Usingen, Idstein, Wiesbaden and Lahr; William Henry II received Nassau-Saarbrücken and some smaller territories. He then moved his residence from Usingen in the Taunus to Schloss Biebrich in Biebrich and continued the progressive policies of his mother.

Charles died in 1775 in Biebrich and was succeeded by his son Charles William.

== Marriage and issue ==
On 26 December 1734 Charles married Princess Christine Wilhelmine of Saxe-Eisenach (born: 1711), a daughter of Duke John William III. The marriage produced four children:

- Charles William (1735–1803), Prince of Nassau-Usingen
- Christine (1736–1741)
- Frederick Augustus (1738–1816), Prince of Nassau-Usingen (1803–1816) and Duke of Nassau (1806–1816)
- John Adolph (1740–1793), Prussian general

In the second, morganatic marriage, Charles married Magdalene Gross from Wiesbaden (born: 1712). From this marriage he also had four children:

- Philippa Catherine von Biebrich (born: Idstein 17 May 1744; died: 17 July 1798), married at Biebrich June 1773 to Baron Karl Friedrich von Kruse (1738–1806)
- Karl Philipp von Biebrich, Count von Weilnau (born: 25 March 1746; died: 15 August 1789 Wiesbaden). The Nassau Family Pact was executed in 1783, but he was not invited to be a signatory because of the morganatic marriage of his parents.
- Sophie Christine (born: 20 June 1750; died: 16 November 1750)
- Wilhelm Heinrich (born: 15 February 1755; died: 6 April 1755)

== Ancestry ==
Ancestors of Charles, Prince of Nassau-Usingen

8. William Louis, Count of Nassau-Saarbrücken
4. Walrad, Prince of Nassau-Usingen
9. Anna Amalie of Baden-Durlach
2. William Henry, Prince of Nassau-Usingen
10. Eustache III de Croÿ-Roeulx
5. Catherine Françoise de Croÿ-Roeulx
11. Theodora of Ketteler-Lage
1. Charles, Prince of Nassau-Usingen
12. George Louis of Nassau-Dillenburg
6. Henry, Prince of Nassau-Dillenburg
13. Anna Augusta of Brunswick-Wolfenbüttel
3. Charlotte Amalie of Nassau-Dillenburg
14. George III of Brieg
7. Dorothea Elisabeth of Brieg
15. Sophie Catherine of Münsterberg-Oels

== Bibliography ==
- Ernst Joachim (1882). "Karl von Nassau-Usingen" . Allgemeine Deutsche Biographie (in German). Vol. 15. Leipzig: Duncker & Humblot. p. 313.

Charles, Prince of Nassau-Usingen House of Nassau Born: 31 December 1712 Died: 21 June 1775
Preceded by William Henry	Prince of Nassau-Usingen; 1718-1775	Succeeded by Charles William
Preceded by Frederick Louis as Count of Nassau-Saarbrücken	Prince of Nassau-Saarbrücken; 1728-1735	Succeeded by William Henry II
