= Charles William, Prince of Nassau-Usingen =

Prince of Nassau-Usingen (1775–1803)

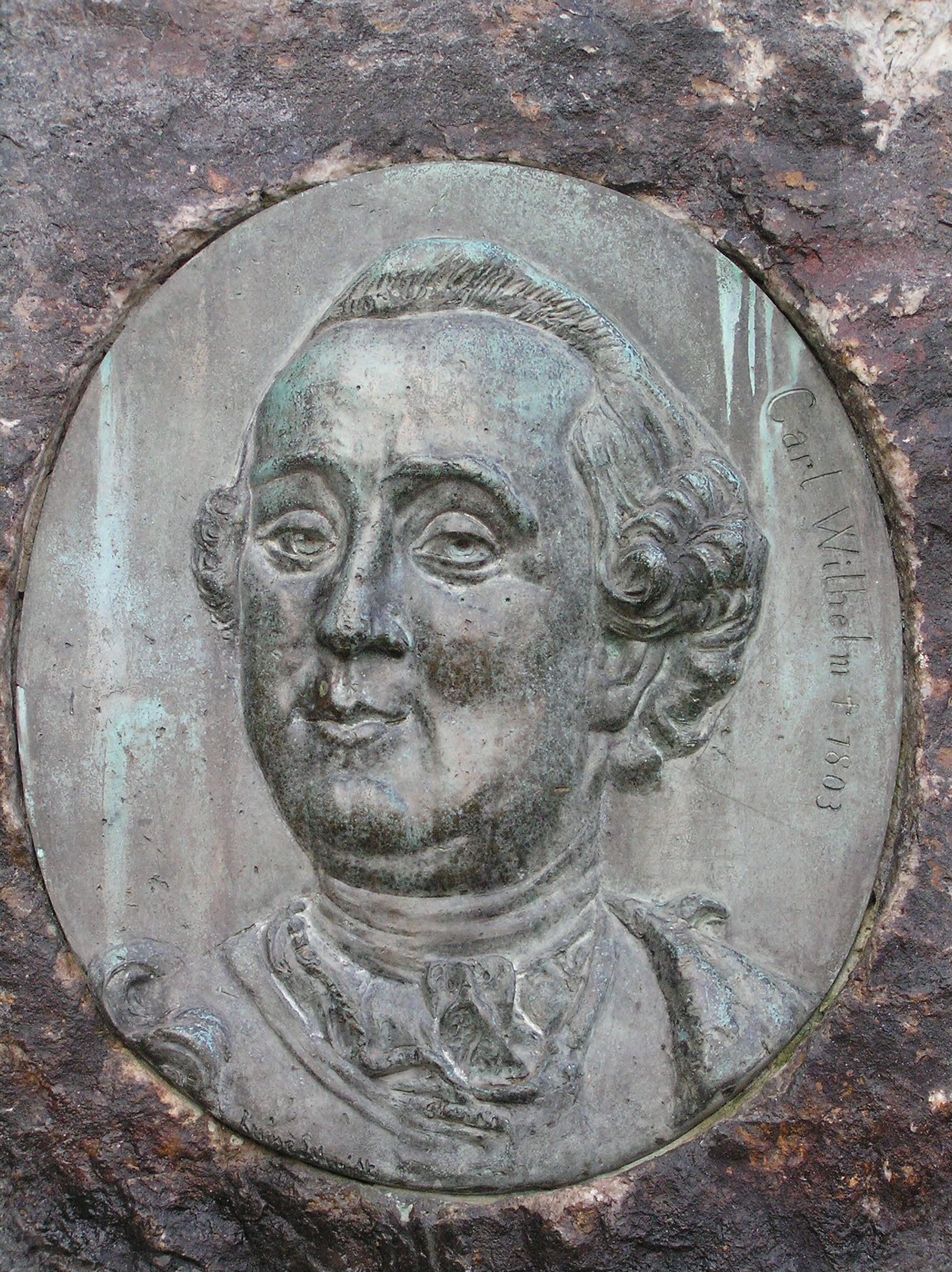
- Born: 9 November 1735; Usingen
- Died: 17 May 1803 (aged 67); Biebrich
- Noble family: House of Nassau
- Spouse: Countess Caroline Felizitas of Leiningen-Dagsburg
- Issue: Caroline, Landgravine of Hesse-Kassel
- Father: Charles, Prince of Nassau-Usingen
- Mother: Princess Christine Wilhelmine of Saxe-Eisenach

Charles William (9 November 1735 – 17 May 1803) was Prince of Nassau-Usingen from 1775 until his death. From 1797 until his death, he was also titular Prince of Nassau-Saarbrücken, however, Nassau-Saarbrücken was occupied by France during that period.

He was born in Usingen, the eldest son of Prince Charles of Nassau-Usingen and his wife, Christina Wilhelmina, the daughter of Duke John William III of Saxe-Eisenach.

In 1770, Charles William became Lieutenant-General in the Dutch army. In 1789, he was promoted to general and in 1790 to colonel of the Walloon regiment and captain of the grenadiers.

In 1775, he succeeded his father as Prince of Nassau-Usingen. In 1783, he concluded a treaty of inheritance with the princes of Nassau-Saarbrücken, Nassau-Weilburg and Nassau-Dietz (i.e., Orange-Nassau), in which it was agreed that the Nassau lands were indivisible and that mutual succession among the various branches based on primogeniture would be observed.

In 1797, Prince Henry Louis of Nassau-Saarbrücken died childless and Charles William inherited his principality. However, under the Treaty of Lunéville, the territories on the left bank of the Rhine were lost to France. The Reichsdeputationshauptschluss of 1803 compensated Charles William with territories taken from the Electorate of Mainz, the Electorate of Cologne, Electorate of the Palatinate and Hesse.

Charles William died later that year. Since he had no male heir, he was succeeded by his younger brother Frederick Augustus.

== Marriage and issue ==
Charles William married Countess Caroline Felizitas of Leiningen-Dagsburg, the daughter of Christian Karl Reinhard of Leiningen-Dagsburg-Falkenburg-Heidesheim. Charles William and Carolina Felicitas had four children:

- Prince Karl Wilhelm (1761–1763)
- Princess Caroline (1762–1823), who married Prince Frederick of Hesse-Kassel (1747–1837), the son of Landgrave Frederick II and Princess Mary of Great Britain and the founder of the cadet branch Hesse-Kassel-Rumpenheim.
- Princess Luise (1763–1845)
- Prince NN of Nassau-Usingen (1768 – died in infancy)

== Ancestry ==
Ancestors of Charles William, Prince of Nassau-Usingen

8. Walrad, Prince of Nassau-Usingen
4. William Henry, Prince of Nassau-Usingen
9. Princess Catharine Françoise de Croÿ-Roeulx
2. Charles, Prince of Nassau-Usingen
10. Henry, Prince of Nassau-Dillenburg
5. Countess Charlotte Amalie of Nassau-Dillenburg
11. Princess Dorothea Elisabeth of Brieg
1. Charles William, Prince of Nassau-Usingen
12. John George I, Duke of Saxe-Eisenach
6. John William III, Duke of Saxe-Eisenach
13. Johannetta of Sayn-Wittgenstein
3. Princess Christine Wilhelmine of Saxe-Eisenach
14. Johann Adolf I, Duke of Saxe-Weissenfels
7. Duchess Magdalene Sibylle of Saxe-Weissenfels
15. Duchess Johanna Magdalena of Saxe-Altenburg

Charles William, Prince of Nassau-Usingen House of Nassau Born: 9 November 1735 Died: 17 May 1803
Preceded by Charles	Prince of Nassau-Usingen; 1775-1803	Succeeded by Frederick Augustus
Preceded by Henry Louis	Prince of Nassau-Saarbrücken; 1797-1803	Succeeded by Adolph
