= John Adolph of Nassau-Usingen =

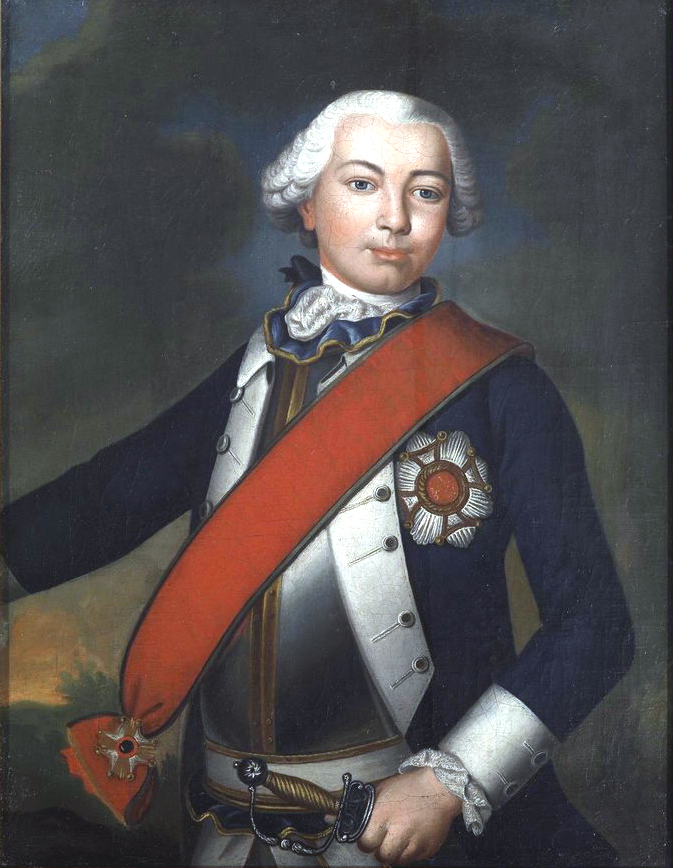
- Born: 17 July 1740; Biebrich
- Died: 10 December 1793 (aged 53); Wiesbaden
- Noble family: House of Nassau
- Father: Charles, Prince of Nassau-Usingen
- Mother: Christine Wilhelmine of Saxe-Eisenach

John Adolph of Nassau-Usingen (17 July 1740 in Biebrich – 10 December 1793 in Wiesbaden) was Count of Saarbrücken and Saarwerden and Lord of Lahr, Wiesbaden and Idstein. He served as a colonel in the French army and later in the royal Prussian army as Major-General and as chief of the Fusilier Regiment No. 47.

== Early life ==
Born into an ancient House of Nassau, he was the younger son of the ruling Prince Charles of Nassau-Usingen and his wife, Princess Christine Wilhelmine of Saxe-Eisenach (1711–1740).

== Biography ==
In 1749 he went to the Netherlands with his older brothers and studied at Utrecht University for three years.

In 1752, he joined the French army. He achieved the rank of colonel and led the infantry regiment von Fersen. In 1758, he traded it for the cavalry regiment Nassau-Saarbrücken. During the Seven Years' War, he spent the years 1757 to 1761 fighting in Germany. He fought in the battles of Hastenbeck, Sonderhausen, Lutternberg, Bergen and Minden. He also participated in the sieges of Kassel and Wolfenbüttel and he fought at Grüneberg and Armöneburg. During the Battle of Sonderhausen, he was hit in the left shoulder.

In 1760, he received the military Order of Merit. In 1761, he was promoted to Brigadier and in 1762 to Maréchal de Camp (major general). In 1763, he received the Palatinate Order of Saint Hubert.

In 1764, he joined the Prussian army under King Frederick II. He held the rank of Major-General and led the Fusilier Regiment No. 47. (Grabow). In the War of the Bavarian Succession, his regiment was part of the army of Prince Henry. However, John Adolph was accused of embezzling army money and he left the army in outrage. He returned to the French army. Nevertheless, he received the Prussian Pour le Mérite Order in 1793.

== Personal life ==
He was married to Baroness Carolina Wilhelmina von Reischach zum Reichenstein (1740-1804), who previously served as lady in waiting at the princely court of Nassau-Usingen in Biebrich and princely court of Hesse-Cassel in Hanau.

== Death ==
He died in 1793 in Wiesbaden, childless.
