= John Adolph =

John Adolph may refer to:

- John Adolph of Nassau-Usingen (1740–1793)
- John Adolph, Duke of Schleswig-Holstein-Sonderburg-Norburg (1576–1624)

== See also ==
- Adolph John (disambiguation)
