= Order of Orange-Nassau =

Dutch order of chivalry

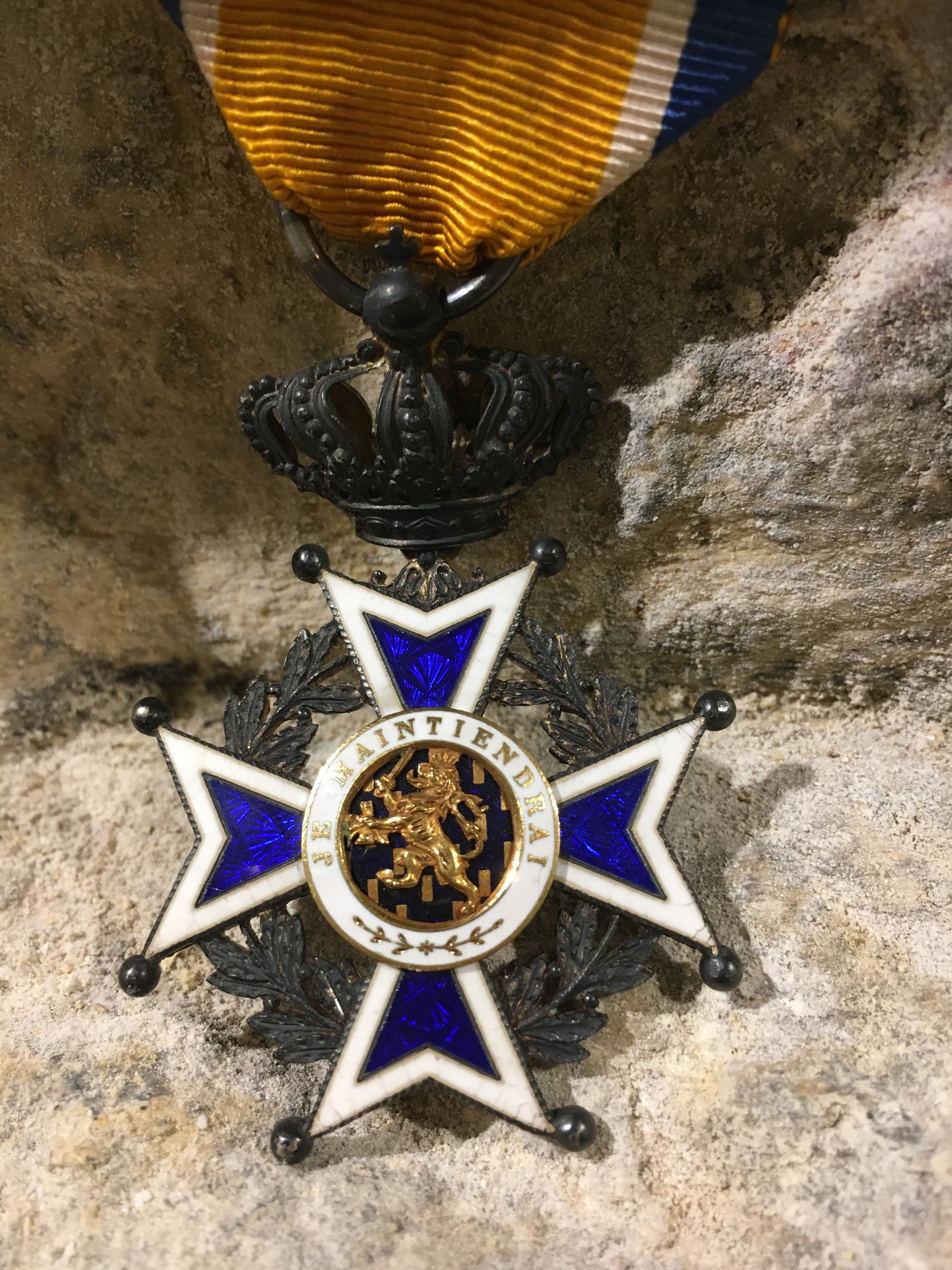
- Knight's Cross of the Order of Orange-Nassau

Awarded by the Kingdom of the Netherlands
- Type: Order of chivalry
- Established: 4 April 1892
- Motto: Je maintiendrai
- Eligibility: Special merits for society
- Status: Currently constituted
- Grand Master: Willem-Alexander of the Netherlands
- Grades: Knight Grand Cross; Grand Officer; Commander; Officer; Knight; Member
- Former grades: Gold, silver, bronze medal

Precedence
- Next (higher): Order of the Netherlands Lion
- Next (lower): Order of the Gold Lion of the House of Nassau
- Ribbon bar

The Order of Orange-Nassau (Dutch: Orde van Oranje-Nassau) is a civil and military Dutch order of chivalry founded on 4 April 1892 by the queen regent, Emma of the Netherlands.

The order is a chivalric order open to "everyone who has performed acts of special merits for society." These are people who deserve appreciation and recognition from society for the special way in which they have carried out their activities.

Titles, prefixes, or post-nominals are not used in the Netherlands – the only exception being the Military Order of William.

== History ==
In 1841 William II of the Netherlands, as Grand Duke of Luxembourg, created the Order of the Oak Crown. Although this was officially not a Dutch order, honours were regularly conferred on Dutch people. After the death of William III, Luxembourg, according to the Nassau Family Pact, became the domain of the other branch of the House of Nassau. In the Netherlands the need for a third order, beside the Military William Order and Order of the Netherlands Lion was felt, so that royal honours could be conferred upon foreign diplomats and people from lower ranks and classes.

During World War II, the Order of Orange-Nassau was bestowed upon both members of the Netherlands military and members of foreign services who had helped liberate the Netherlands from Nazi German occupation, and those who helped liberate the former Dutch colonies in the Pacific. In the modern age, the Orange-Nassau is still the most active civil and military decoration of the Netherlands, and ranks after the Order of the Netherlands Lion. The order is typically awarded each year on the Monarch's official birthday (currently April 27) with around 3500 appointments to the order made public. The order is also used to honour foreign princes, ministers, dignitaries and diplomats.

In 1994, the Dutch honours system was extensively revised after almost thirty years of discussion. This revision by law intended to create a more democratic honours system, disconnecting the level of the honours from rank and social status. In principle, since then, everyone in Dutch society has the possibility of being honoured. An honour is only awarded on the basis of special, personal merits for society. Before this revision, the order consisted of five grades with additional honorary medals (gold, silver and bronze). The honorary medals were only affiliated with the order and bearers were not formally included in the order. In 1996, the honorary medals were abolished and replaced by the Member Class of the Order of Orange-Nassau, which is reserved for Dutch citizens. The vast majority of awards are at the level of Member and are for voluntary service; the grade of Knight is awarded for outstanding personal achievement, the grade of Officer for contributions of national or international significance (e.g. distinguished professors; former ministers, but also very well-known disc jockeys or even a tattooist of very high reputation). The Officer grade is the first of what are referred to as the 'special decorations'. The grade of Commander is very sparingly awarded, and the two highest grades are awarded only very rarely indeed (for example to those with a record of distinguished service in public life who have occupied many high positions over a good number of years).

== Grades ==
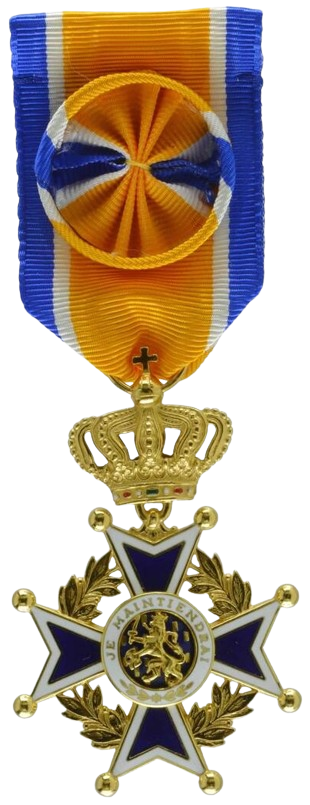
Officer's Cross

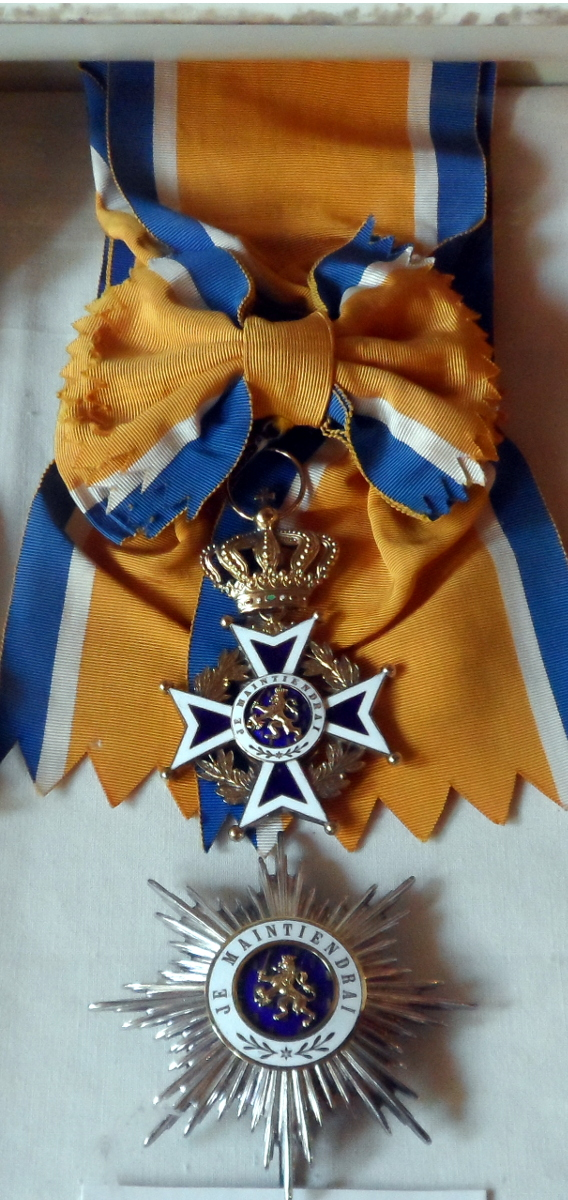
Star and riband of a Knight's Grand Cross

The Order of Orange-Nassau has two divisions, civil and military, the former denoted by a wreath of laurel on the badges, and the latter by crossed swords on both the badges and the stars.

The king or queen regnant of the Netherlands is the Grand Master of the Order of Orange-Nassau.

=== Since 1996 ===
In addition to the two divisions, since 1996 the Order of Orange-Nassau has been issued in six classes:

1. Knight Grand Cross – the gold badge may be worn on a sash on the right shoulder, plus an 8-pointed star on the left chest
2. Grand Officer – the gold badge may be worn by men on a necklet, and by women worn on a ribbon tied as a bow at the left chest; also a 4-pointed star is worn on the left chest
3. Commander – the gold badge may be worn by men on a necklet, and by women worn on a ribbon tied as a bow at the left chest
4. Officer – wears the gold badge on a ribbon with a rosette on the left chest
5. Knight – wears a gold badge on a ribbon with a silver crown on the left chest
6. Member – wears a silver badge on a ribbon on the left chest

Ribbon bars of the Order of Orange-Nassau - since 1996
Knight Grand Cross	Grand Officer	Commander
Officer	Knight	Member

For the grades of Knight and Member, the badges are made of silver. For the other grades, the silver is gilded.

=== Prior to 1996 ===
Until 1996, the Order of Orange-Nassau consisted of five grades. In addition, honorary medals were issued in Gold, Silver and Bronze, but these were only affiliated with the order; the bearers of the medal were not members of the order. Now no longer issued, these were replaced by the sixth grade: "Member". Recipients wore the medal on a ribbon on the left chest.

Ribbon bars of the Order of Orange-Nassau - until 1996
Knight Grand Cross	Grand Officer	Commander
Officer	Knight	
Gold medal	Silver medal	Bronze medal

== Insignia ==
The badge of the order is a blue-enamelled, white enamel-bordered Maltese Cross, in gilt for the officers and above, in silver for knights and members. The obverse central disc displays the King's coat of arms in gold and blue enamel, surrounded by a white enamel ring bearing the national motto Je Maintiendrai (I shall maintain). The reverse central disc has the crowned monogram "W" (for Queen Wilhelmina) surrounded by the motto God Zij Met Ons (God be with us). The badge hangs from a royal crown. The civil division has a wreath of laurel between the arms of the cross; the military division has crossed swords instead. The badge is attached to a ribbon which is orange with white and blue border stripes. The way the badge and ribbon should be worn differs between men and women.

The star of the order is a silver star with straight rays, in eight points for Grand Cross and in four points for Grand Officer; the central disc has the King's arms in gold and blue enamel, surrounded by a white enamel ring bearing the Dutch national motto Je Maintiendrai. The military division has crossed swords.

Grade	Knight Grand Cross	Grand Officer	Commander	Officer	Knight	Member
Insignia						
