= County of Nassau-Usingen =

State of the Holy Roman Empire (1659–1806)

- 1659–1806
- Flag
- Status: State of the Holy Roman Empire (1659–1806); State of the Confederation of the Rhine (1806)
- Capital: Usingen
- Government: County/Principality
- Count/Prince
  - 1659–1702: Walrad (first)
- History
  - Established: 1659
  - Became principality: 1688
  - Joined the Confederation of the Rhine: July 17, 1806
  - Inherited by Nassau-Weilberg to form the Duchy of Nassau: August 30, 1806
- Currency: Guilder
Succeeded by
Duchy of Nassau
- Today part of: Germany

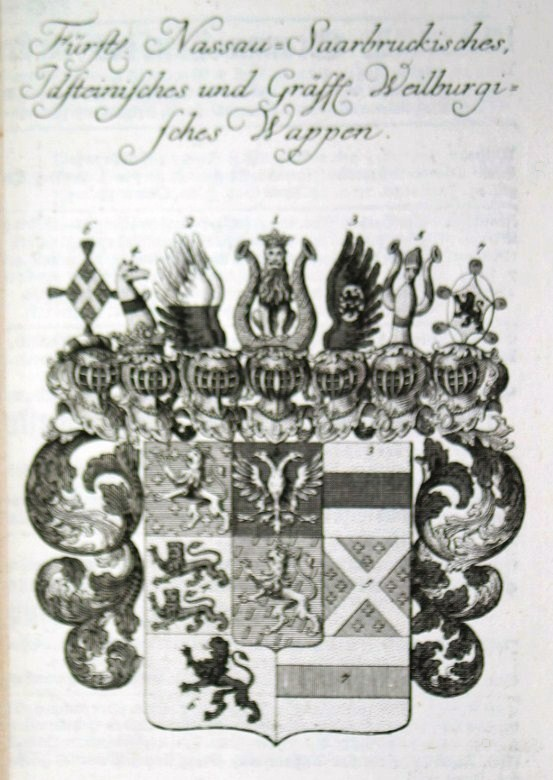
Arms of Nassau-Usingen.

Nassau-Usingen was a county of the Holy Roman Empire in the Upper Rhenish Circle that became a principality in 1688.

The origin of the county lies in the medieval county of Weilnau that was acquired by the counts of Nassau-Weilburg in 1602. That county was divided in 1629 into the lines of Nassau-Weilburg, Nassau-Idstein and Nassau-Saarbrücken. However, the division became effective only thirty years later, in 1659.

The emerging counties were Nassau-Saarbrücken, Nassau-Ottweiler and Nassau-Usingen. At the beginning of the 18th century, three of the Nassau lines died out and Nassau-Usingen became their successor (1721 Nassau-Idstein, 1723 Nassau-Ottweiler und 1728 Nassau-Saarbrücken). In 1735, Nassau-Usingen was divided again into Nassau-Usingen and Nassau-Saarbrücken. In 1797, Nassau-Usingen inherited Nassau-Saarbrücken.

On July 17, 1806, the counties of Nassau-Usingen and Nassau-Weilburg joined the Confederation of the Rhine. Under pressure from Napoleon, both counties merged to become the Duchy of Nassau on August 30, 1806, under joint rule of Prince Frederick August of Nassau-Usingen and his younger cousin Prince Frederick William of Nassau-Weilburg. As Frederick August had no heirs, he agreed that Frederick William should become sole ruler after his death. However, Frederick William died from a fall on the stairs at Schloss Weilburg on 9 January 1816, and it was his son William who became duke of a unified Nassau.

The title has been carried in pretense by Prince Frederick August's half-brother Karl Philip's line.

== List of rulers ==
Ruler	Born	Reign	Ruling part	Consort	Death	Notes
Walrad	25 February 1635; Roermond; Seventh son of William Louis, Count of Nassau-Saarbrücken and Anna Amalia of Baden-Durlach	1659 – 17 October 1702	County of Usingen (1659–88) Principality of Usingen (1688–1702)	Catherine Françoise of Croÿ-Roeulx; 16 June 1678; Mechelen three children Magdalena Elizabeth of Löwenstein-Wertheim-Rochefort; 1686 no children	17 October 1702; Usingen aged 66	
William Henry	2 May 1684 's-Hertogenbosch; Son of Walrad and Catherine Françoise of Croÿ-Roeulx	17 October 1702 – 14 February 1718	Principality of Usingen	Charlotte Amalia of Nassau-Dillenburg; 15 April 1706; Dillenburg nine children	14 February 1718; Usingen aged 33	
Regency of Charlotte Amalia of Nassau-Dillenburg (1718–1734)						Charles was the only heir, but in 1741 he divided the inheritance, and gave Saarbrücken to his brother (raised as a principality), and retained Usingen.
Charles	31 December 1712; Usingen; First son of William Henry, Prince of Nassau-Usingen and Charlotte Amalia of Nassau-Dillenburg	14 February 1718 – 21 June 1775	Principality of Usingen	Christine Wilhelmine of Saxe-Eisenach; 26 December 1734 four children Magdalene Gross of Wiesbaden after 1740 (morganatic) four children	21 June 1775; Biebrich aged 62	Charles was the only heir, but in 1741 he divided the inheritance, and gave Saarbrücken to his brother (raised as a principality), and retained Usingen.
Charles William	9 November 1735; Usingen; First son of Charles and Christina Wilhelmina of Saxe-Eisenach	21 June 1775 – 17 May 1803	Principality of Usingen	Caroline Felizitas of Leiningen-Dagsburg; 16 April 1760 one child	17 May 1803; Biebrich aged 67	Left no descendants. He was succeeded by his brother.
In 1783, the heads of various branches of the House of Nassau sealed the Nassau Family Pact (Erbverein) to regulate future succession in their states, and to establish a dynastic hierarchy whereby the Prince of Orange-Nassau-Dietz was recognised as President of the House of Nassau.
Frederick Augustus	23 April 1738; Usingen; Second son of Charles and Christine Wilhelmine of Saxe-Eisenach	17 May 1803 – 24 March 1816	Principality of Usingen	Louise of Waldeck; 9 June 1775 seven children	24 March 1816; Wiesbaden aged 77	
Frederick Augustus	23 April 1738; Usingen; Second son of Charles and Christine Wilhelmine of Saxe-Eisenach	30 August 1806 – 24 March 1816	Duchy of Nassau	Louise of Waldeck; 9 June 1775 seven children	24 March 1816; Wiesbaden aged 77	
Nassau-Usingen united with Nassau-Weilburg to form the Duchy of Nassau

== See also ==
- House of Nassau
- Duchy of Nassau
- House of Nassau-Weilburg

== Sources ==
- The Dutch Nassau-Usingen and the German Nassau-Usingen Wikipedia articles
- The German webpage Fürstentum Nassau-Usingen
- The divisions of the House of Nassau
