= Countess Karoline Felizitas of Leiningen-Dagsburg-Falkenburg =

German Imperial countess

Countess Caroline Felizitas of Leiningen-Dagsburg
- Princess consort of Nassau-Usingen
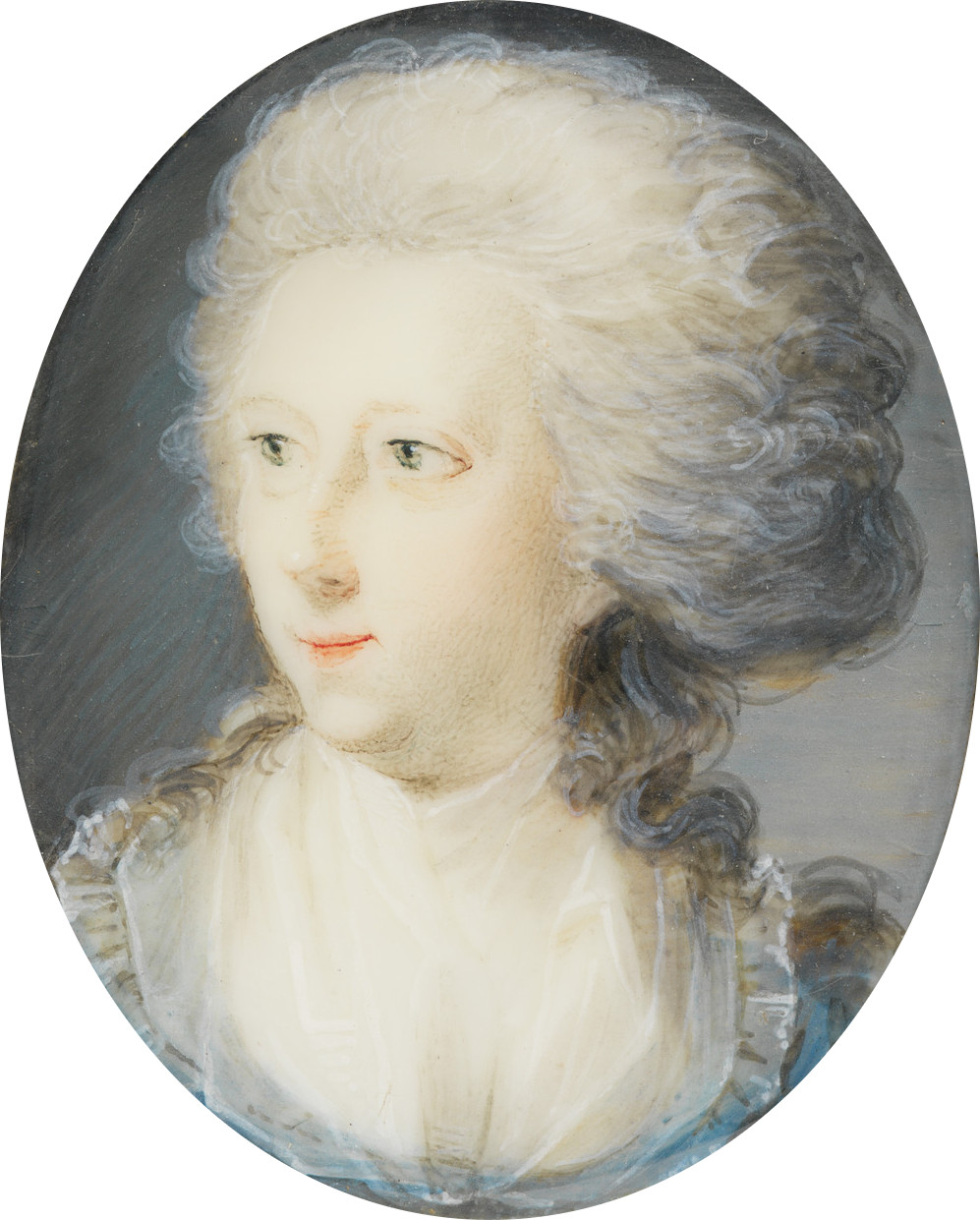
- Portrait, c. 1795
- Born: 22 May 1734; Heidesheim, Rhineland-Palatinate, Germany.
- Died: 8 May 1810 (aged 75); Frankfurt, Germany.
- Noble family: House of Leiningen
- Spouse: Charles William, Prince of Nassau-Usingen (m. 1760; died 1797)
- Issue: Prince Karl Wilhelm; Caroline, Landgravine of Hesse-Kassel; Princess Luise
- Father: Christian Karl Reinhard of Leiningen-Dagsburg-Falkenburg
- Mother: Katharina Polyxena of Solms-Rödelheim-Assenheim

Caroline Felizitas of Leiningen-Dagsburg-Falkenburg (22 May 1734 – 8 May 1810) was a German Imperial countess. By birth, she was member of the House of Leiningen and by marriage member of the House of Nassau.

== Early life ==
She was born in Heidesheim, as the youngest daughter of Count Christian Karl Reinhard of Leiningen-Dagsburg-Falkenburg and his wife, Countess Katherina Polyxena of Solms-Rödelheim and Assenheim (1702-1765).

== Marriage and issue ==
She married Charles William, Prince of Nassau-Usingen, son of Charles, Prince of Nassau-Usingen and Princess Christiane Wilhelmine of Saxe-Eisenach, on 16 April 1760 in Heidesheim am Rhein.

They had four children:

- Karl Wilhelm (26 March 1761 - 10 March 1763).
- Karoline Polyxena (4 April 1762 - 17 August 1823).
- Luise Henriette Karoline (14 June 1763 - 30 March 1845).
- A son (9 March 1768 - March 1768).

Caroline died in Frankfurt.

== Ancestry ==
Ancestors of Countess Karoline Felizitas of Leiningen-Dagsburg-Falkenburg

8. Count Georg Wilhelm of Leiningen-Dagsburg-Falkenburg
4. Johann, Count of Leiningen-Dagsburg-Falkenburg
9. Countess Anna Elisabeth of Daun-Falkenstein
2. Count Christian Karl Reinhard of Leiningen-Dagsburg-Falkenburg
10. Johann Reinhard II, Count of Hanau-Lichtenberg
5. Countess Johanna Magdalene of Hanau-Lichtenberg
11. Countess Palatine Anna Magdalena of Birkenfeld-Bischweiler
1. Countess Caroline Felizitas of Leiningen-Dagsburg-Falkenburg
12. Johann August, Count of Solms-Rödelheim
6. Count Ludwig of Solms-Rödelheim
13. Countess Eleonore Cratz of Scharfenstein
3. Countess Katharina Polyxena of Solms-Rödelheim
14. Count Friedrich of Ahlefeldt
7. Countess Charlotte Sibylle of Ahlefeldt
15. Countess Marie Elisabeth of Leiningen-Dagsburg-Hartenburg
