= Wiesbaden Bismarck Tower =

Coordinates: 50°04′51″N 8°16′05″E

The Wiesbaden Bismarck Tower was one of approximately 240 monuments built between 1869 and 1934 in honour of Otto von Bismarck (d.1898), who oversaw the unification of Germany and served as its first chancellor. Wiesbaden's Bismarck Tower was the tallest Bismarck memorial with a height of 50 metres (160 ft). The wooden tower was built in 1910 close to the former watch tower on the Height of Bierstadt. It was planned only as interim solution to be later replaced by a solid structure with a lift. However, this project did not materialise due to lack of funding. In 1916 the tower, nicknamed the "Eiffel Tower of Wiesbaden", was closed to visitors and used as a military observation post. In 1918 it was demolished due to its poor state of repair.

== See also ==
- List of towers
