= Evangelische Kirche, Bierstadt =

Coordinates: 50.083590°N 8.286266°E

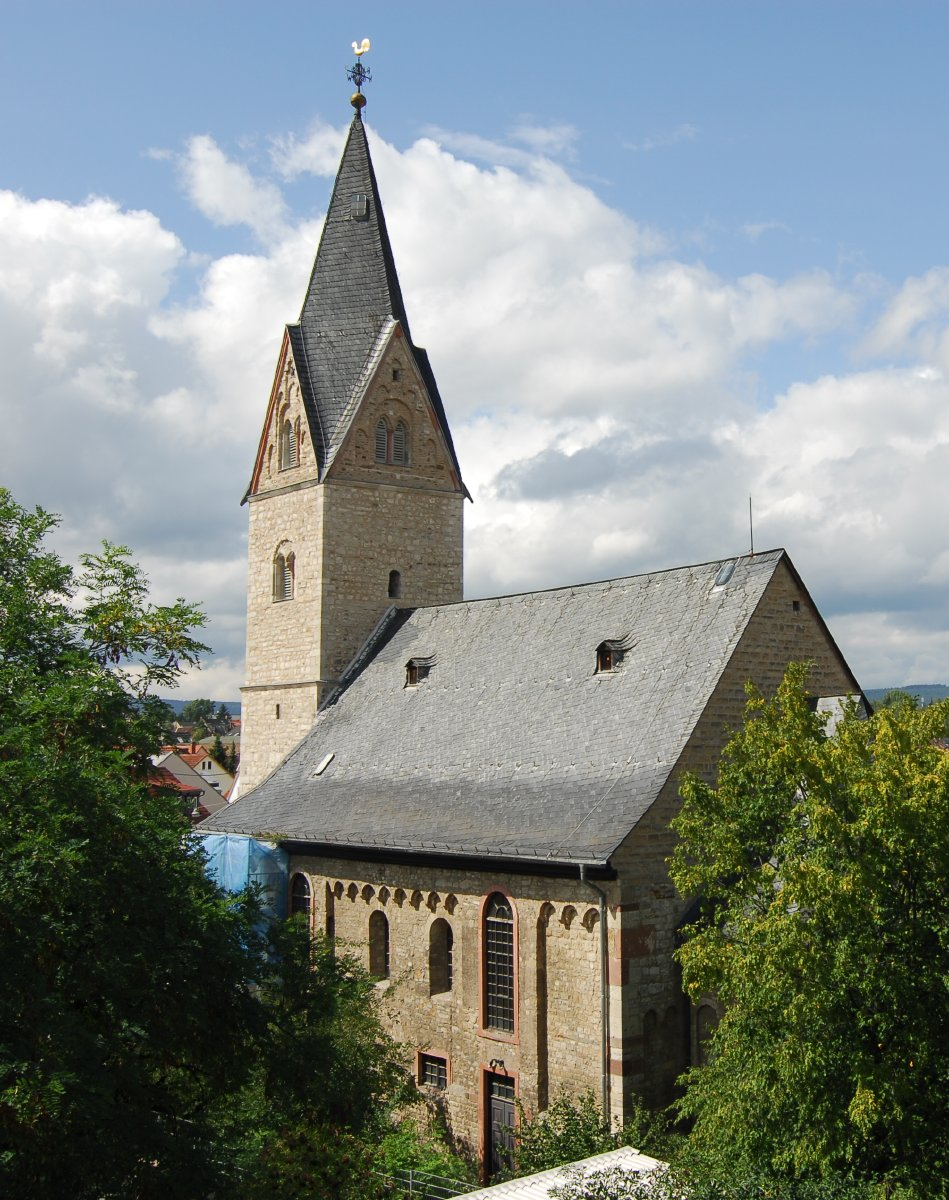
Evangelische Kirche)

The Evangelische Kirche is a Protestant church building and congration in Bierstadt, a borough of Wiesbaden, the capital of Hesse, Germany. The present building dates from the 11th century, but was restored in Baroque style in the 1730s.

== History ==
A former church, documented in 925, was replaced in the 11th century by a simple hall church with an apse, dedicated to Saint Nicholas. A high arch separated choir and the nave. The baptismal font was in the back of the church. The tower in the west was added in the late 12th century, featuring a rhombic roof since the beginning of the 13th century. Frescoes from the 14th century were found aroung the windows in the choir. A winged altarpiece by Martin Caldenbach, a pupil of Albrecht Dürer, was installed around 1500, depicting the nativity of Jesus left, the adoration of the Magi right, and a Last Supper scene in the predella.

The church was left dilapidated after the Thirty Years' War; it was restored with Baroque interior by Johann Jakob Bager from 1731 to 1734, including a barrel vault, larger windows, a portal in the west, balconies on three sides, and an altar including a pulpit. The present pipe organ by G. F. Steinmeyer & Co. was installed in 1972, with 21 stops, two manuals and pedal.

The parish belongs to the Wiesbaden deanery in the Protestant Church in Hesse and Nassau. It is the oldest extant church of Wiesbaden.
