= Wilhelm Ferdinand Kalle =

German chemist and politician

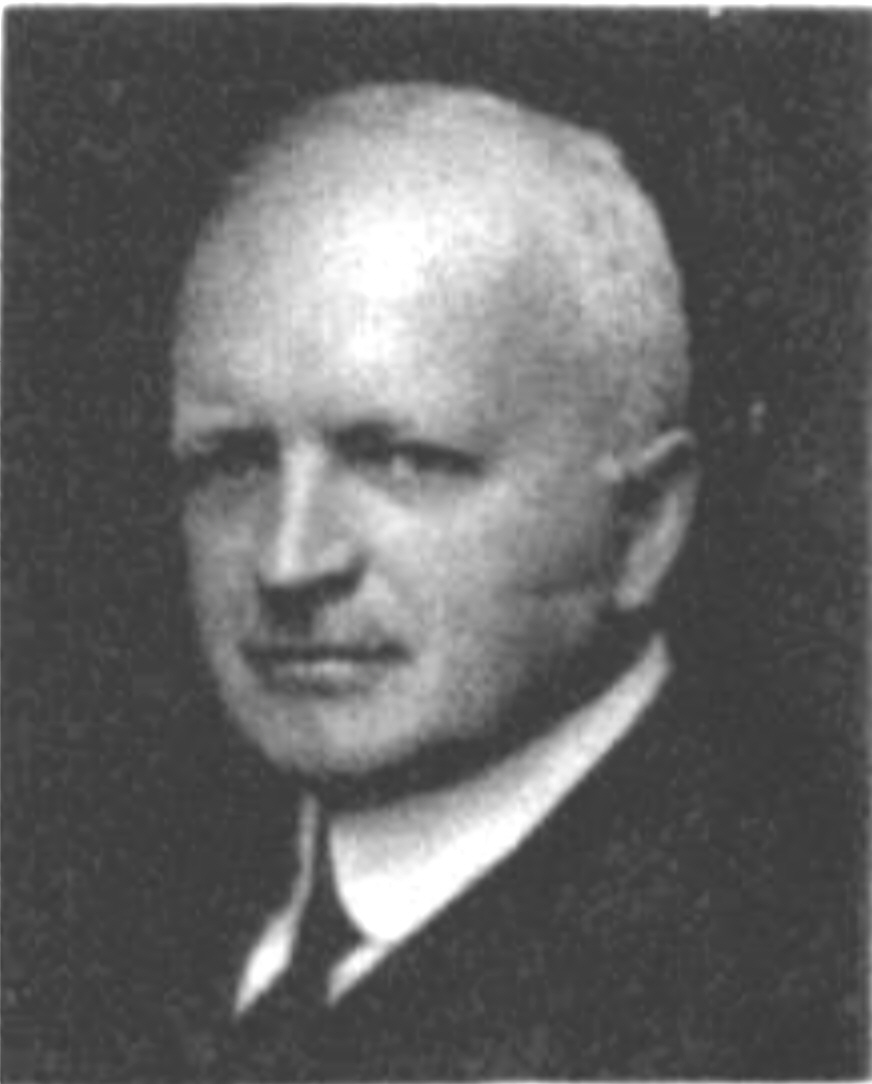
Wilhelm Kalle (1904)

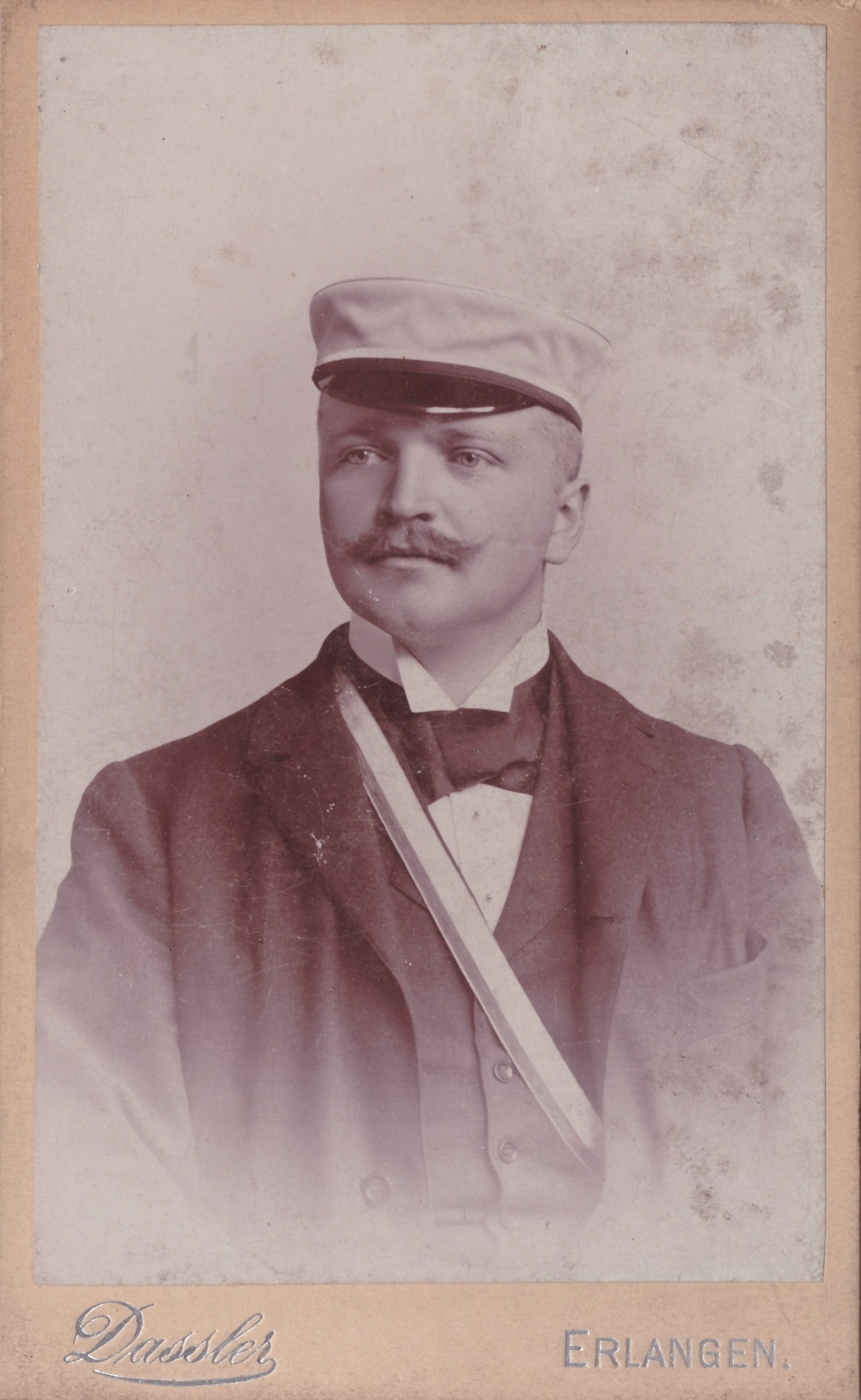
Kalle as a student in Erlangen (1894)

Wilhelm (Jakob) Ferdinand Kalle (born 19 February 1870 in Biebrich (Wiesbaden); died 7 September 1954 in Wiesbaden) was a German chemist, industrialist and politician.

== Life ==
His father was industrialist Wilhelme Kalle. He studied at University of Geneva and at University of Strasbourg. He was also general director of the Kalle & Co. chemical factory as well as a member for German People's Party of the Reichstag and Prussian state parliament.

During the Second World War, he betrayed Zyklon-B developments within I.G. Farben to the USA via Erwin Respondek. He was therefore not charged in the I.G. Farben trial. In 1951, he moved from his previous residence in Tutzing to Wiesbaden, where he also died.
