= Federal Assembly =

Federal Assembly may refer to:

- Federal Assembly (Russia), the Russian federal parliament
- Federal Assembly (Czechoslovakia), the former Czechoslovak federal parliament
- Federal Assembly (Federation of Rhodesia and Nyasaland), the former federal parliament of the Federation of Rhodesia and Nyasaland
- Federal Assembly of Yugoslavia

Under the German name Bundesversammlung:

- Federal Assembly (Austria), the name for a joint session of the two chambers of the Austrian federal parliament
- Federal Convention (Germany), a formal convention that elects the country's Federal President
- Federal Convention (German Confederation), the only organ of the German Confederation (1815-1866)
- Federal Assembly (Switzerland), the Swiss federal parliament
