= Bierstadt =

- Borough of Wiesbaden
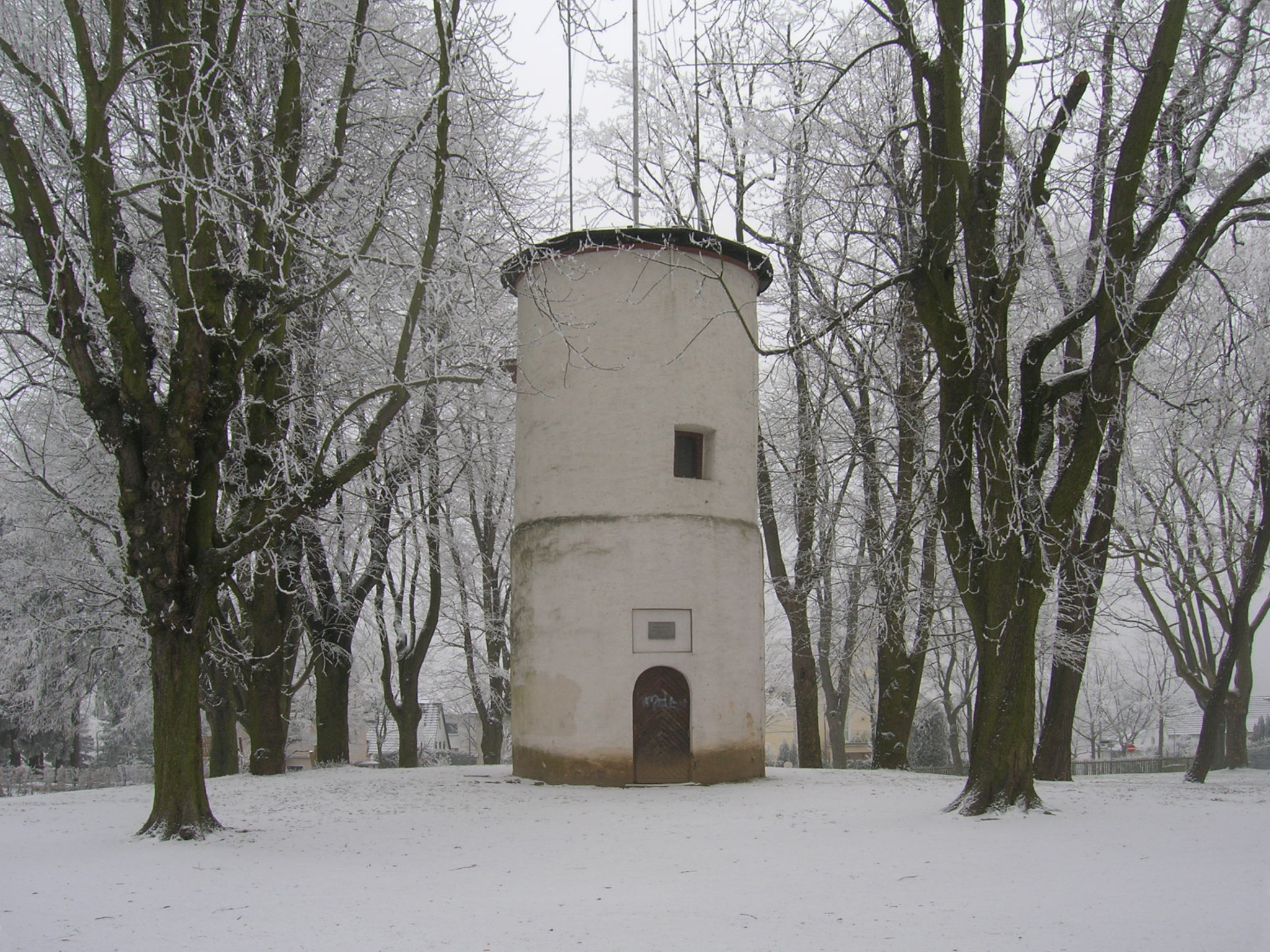
- Watchtower built in 1473

- Coat of arms
- Interactive map of Bierstadt
- Location within Germany Location within Hesse
- Coordinates: 50°05′00″N 8°17′00″E
- Country: Germany
- State: Hesse
- District: Urban district
- City: Wiesbaden
- First mentioned: 927 (1099 years ago)

Government
  - Mayor: Rainer Volland (CDU)

Area
  - Total: 9.22 km^{2} (3.56 sq mi)

Population (2020-12-31)
  - Total: 12,613
  - Density: 1,370/km^{2} (3,540/sq mi)
- Time zone: UTC+01:00 (CET)
  - Summer (DST): UTC+02:00 (CEST)
- Postal codes: 65191
- Dialling codes: 0611
- Vehicle registration: WI

Bierstadt is a borough of the city of Wiesbaden, capital of the state of Hesse, Germany. It is located in the eastern part of the city, directly east of downtown Wiesbaden, and, as of December 2020, has about 12,300 inhabitants. Formerly an independent municipality, the settlement was incorporated into Wiesbaden on April 1, 1928. While Bierstadt can be translated as "Beer Town," the name is actually derived from Brigid of Kildare (German: Brigida von Kildare), patron saint of Bierstadt (Birgidstadt).

== History ==
The earliest traces of settlement in the Bierstadt area date to the Stone Age. However, Bierstadt was first mentioned in historical records, as "Birgidestad", in a deed of gift on March 12, 927. The town was founded by Irish monks, who named it after the Irish national saint, Brigid of Kildare. In the 11th–12th centuries, the (now Protestant) Church of St. Nicholas was built. The church is not only the oldest existing church in Wiesbaden, but, after the Roman-era Heathens' Wall in downtown Wiesbaden, is the second oldest building of any kind in the city.

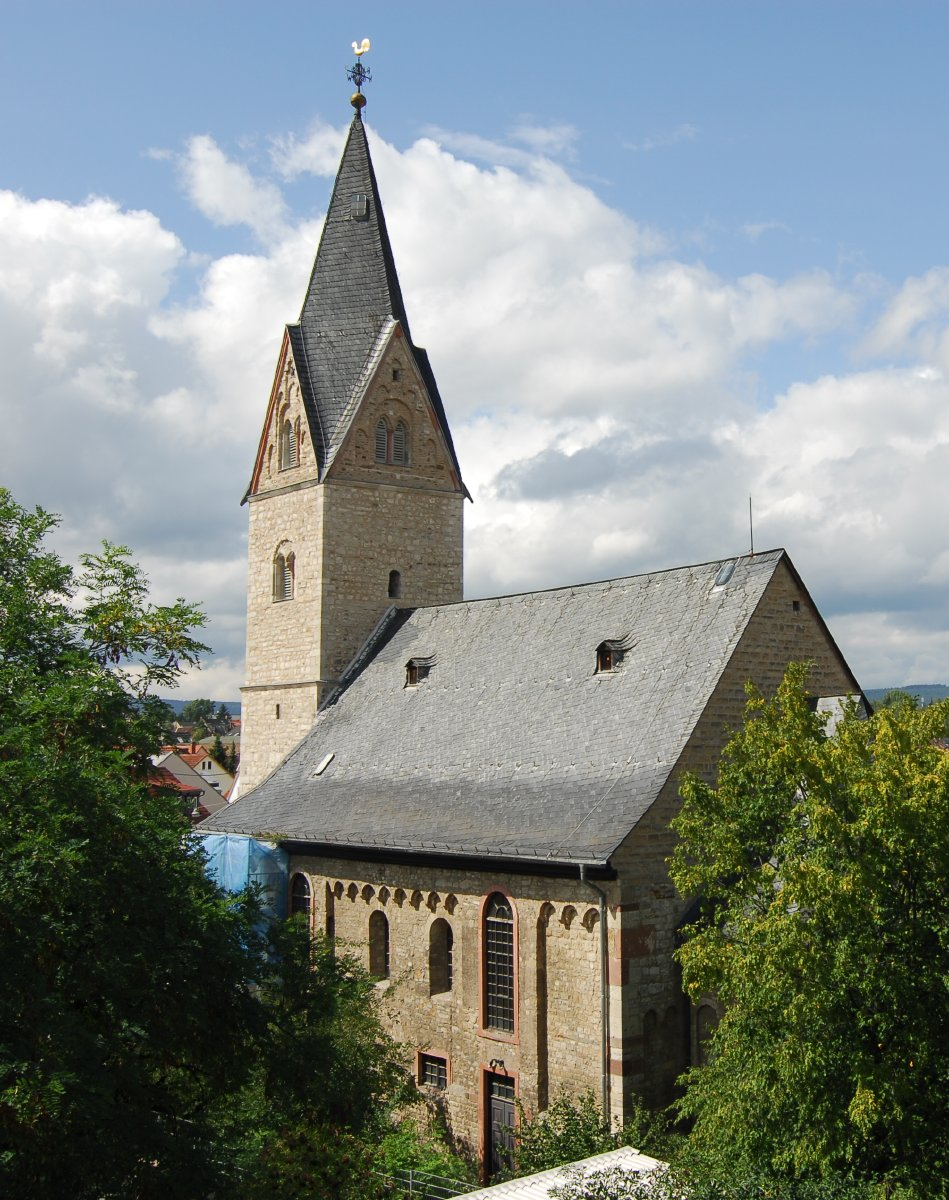
Evangelische Kirche, Bierstadt

In the Middle Ages, Bierstadt came under the dominion of Nassau, but was subject to strong influences from the Archbishop of Mainz. In the wake of the Protestant Reformation, Bierstadt came fully under the control of Nassau; the church became Protestant and was called Evangelische Kirche. After the Thirty Years' War, the town had only 17 inhabitants. Efforts at reconstruction were set back by a fire in 1691. By the middle of the 18th century, Bierstadt had about 500 residents.

The remains of a medieval watchtower, the Bierstadter Warte, are located on a height between Wiesbaden and the borough. The watchtower is now part of the borough's coat of arms. In 1898, a large observation tower, the Wiesbaden Bismarck Tower, was planned to be built at this site. A temporary wooden tower was constructed in 1910, but funding for the permanent structure could not be obtained. The temporary tower was demolished in 1918 due to its to poor state of repair.

During the Third Reich (1933–1945), Nazism dominated Bierstadt. On November 9, 1938, the synagogue, dating to 1827, was completely destroyed. After the Allied victory in World War II, about 1,800 apartments were built for U.S. Air Force personnel. The remaining Aukamm and Crestview U.S. military housing areas, transferred to the Army during the Cold War, are located on the northwest and the west side of Bierstadt, respectively.

== Infrastructure ==
Bierstadt has a library and two schools, including one primary school - Grundschule Bierstadt, and a gymnasium named Theodor-Fliedner-Schule which was formerly a middle school. Bierstadt is next to the Aukammtal and has access to the German Federal Route 455.

Bierstadt has two churches. In addition to the Protestant church (formerly the church of St. Nicholas), there is the Roman Catholic church of St. Birgid.

== Twin towns – sister cities ==
Bierstadt is twinned with:

- Terrasson-Lavilledieu, France
- Theux, Belgium

== Sources ==
- Adapted from the German Wikipedia article.
