= Adolph John =

Adolph John may refer to:

- Adolph John I, Count Palatine of Kleeburg (1629–1689)
- Adolph John II, Count Palatine of Kleeburg (1666–1701)
