= Biebrich (Wiesbaden) =

- Borough of Wiesbaden
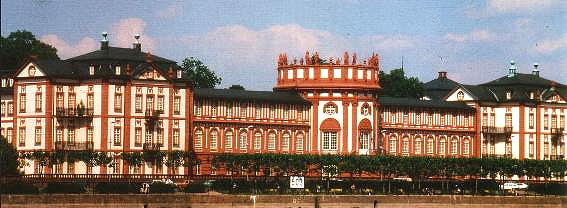
- Biebrich Palace

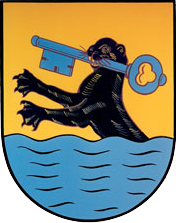
- Coat of arms

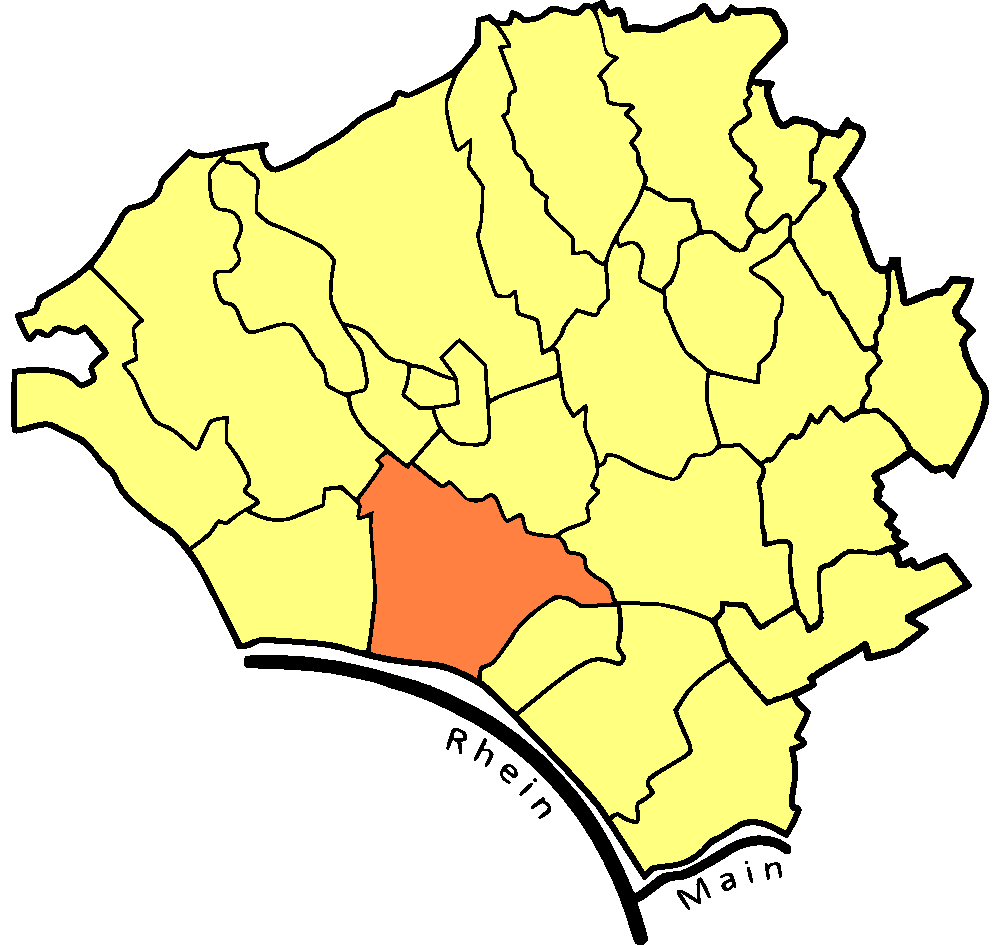
- Location of Biebrich in Wiesbaden
- Interactive map of Biebrich
- Location within Germany Location within Hesse
- Coordinates: 50°03′00″N 8°14′00″E
- Country: Germany
- State: Hesse
- District: Urban district
- City: Wiesbaden

Government
  - Mayor: Horst Klee (CDU)

Area
  - Total: 12.99 km^{2} (5.02 sq mi)

Population (2020-12-31)
  - Total: 38,758
  - Density: 2,984/km^{2} (7,728/sq mi)
- Time zone: UTC+01:00 (CET)
  - Summer (DST): UTC+02:00 (CEST)
- Postal codes: 65203
- Dialling codes: 0611

Biebrich (German pronunciation: [ˈbiːbʁɪç]) is a borough of the city of Wiesbaden, Hesse, Germany. With over 38,000 inhabitants, it is the most-populated of Wiesbaden's boroughs. It is located south of the city center on the Rhine River, opposite the Mainz borough of Mombach. Biebrich was an independent city until it was incorporated into Wiesbaden in 1926.

== History ==
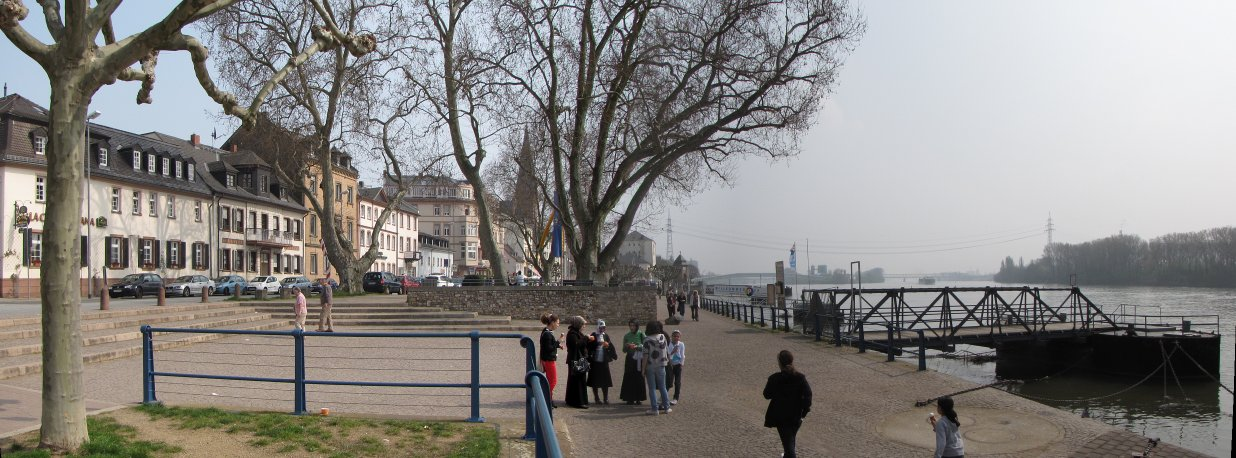
The Rhine at Biebrich

Numerous prehistoric and early-historical archeological finds indicate that the Biebrich area has been continuously inhabited since the Neolithic Age. In the Middle Ages, from the beginning of the reign of Charlemagne, the places Biburc (Biebrich) and Moskebach (Mosbach) were part of the Königssondergau Wiesbaden, held by the Frankish king as his personal property.

Biebrich was first mentioned in historical documents in 874. King Louis the German and his entourage boarded vessels at Villa Biburg on a trip from Frankfurt to Aachen.

Beginning of the 18th century, the princes (Fürsten) of Nassau built the Baroque Biebrich Palace (Schloss Biebrich). When this magnificent building was completed in 1744, the Prince of Nassau-Usingen relocated his residence from the far side of the Taunus to Biebrich. Until the completion of the City Palace in Wiesbaden in 1841, Biebrich was the principal residence of the Princes (and, after 1806, the Dukes) of Nassau.

In the 19th century, Biebrich became an important industrial center of the Rhine Main Area with the plants of Dyckerhoff Concrete (now owned by Buzzi Unicem), Kalle and Albert Chemistry (now Celanese), and Henkell (sparkling wine = Sekt). In the economical crisis of the post-World War I Era, the small town, struck hard by unemployment of the majority of his working-class residents, merged with the bigger and much wealthier nearby spa city of Wiesbaden.

In 1951, the 633rd AAA Gun Battalion, 90mm, 7th Army U.S. NATO Occupation Forces were stationed in Biebrich.

== Twin towns – sister cities ==
Biebrich is twinned with:

- Glarus, Switzerland

== Notable people ==
- Seligman Baer (1825–1897), Biblical scholar and scholar of Jewish liturgy
- Wilhelm Dilthey (1833–1911) and Wilhelm Heinrich Riehl (1823–1897), pioneers of the early German cultural studies of the 19th century, grew up in Biebrich
- Sophia of Nassau (1836–1913), Queen consort of Sweden and Norway (1873–1907), wife of King Oscar II
- Wilhelm Ferdinand Kalle (1870–1954), chemist, industrialist and politician
- Ludwig Beck (1880–1944), general
- Toni Sender (1888–1964), socialist politician
- Walther Gerlach (1889–1979), physicist
- Jürgen Grabowski (1944–2022), footballer, grew up in Biebrich and was part of two its youth clubs (FV Biebrich 1902 und SV Biebrich 1919)
- In the years 1863-1866 was Béla Kéler the music director at the ducal court of Nassau in Wiesbaden
- In 1862, Richard Wagner lived for one year in a newly built country house (later called Villa Annika) near the castle at the bank of the river Rhine, working on the first act and the prelude of the third act of Die Meistersinger. Following the composer's wishes, local wind instrument producer Wilhelm Heckel invented the so-called "Heckelphone" (a basso-oboe, used by Richard Strauss, Paul Hindemith, and others).

== Sources ==
- Partly derived from German Wikipedia
