= Princess Charlotte Amalie of Nassau-Dillenburg =

German regent and noblewoman

Charlotte Amalia of Nassau-Dillenburg
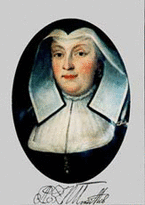
- Born: 1680; Dillenburg
- Died: 1738 (aged 57–58)
- Noble family: House of Nassau
- Spouse: William Henry, Prince of Nassau-Usingen
- Father: Henry, Prince of Nassau-Dillenburg
- Mother: Dorothea Elisabeth of Brieg

Charlotte Amalia of Nassau-Dillenburg (1680 in Dillenburg – 1738) was a German regent; regent of Nassau-Usingen from 1718–1732.

== Life ==
She was a daughter of Prince Henry of Nassau-Dillenburg and Dorothea Elisabeth, a daughter of George III of Brieg.

In 1706 in Dillenburg, she married Prince William Henry of Nassau-Usingen. The couple had ten children; the first child was born on 3 April 1707 and the last one on 6 March 1718.

William Henry died in 1718, and Charlotte Amalia became regent for her underage son Charles.

== Issue ==
Four children reached adulthood:

- Françoise (1707–1750)
- Charles, Prince of Nassau-Usingen (1712–1775)
- Hedwig (1714–1786)
- William Henry, prince of Nassau-Saarbrücken (1718–1768)
