= Biebrich Palace =

Baroque residence in Hesse, Germany built in 1702

- Schloss Biebrich
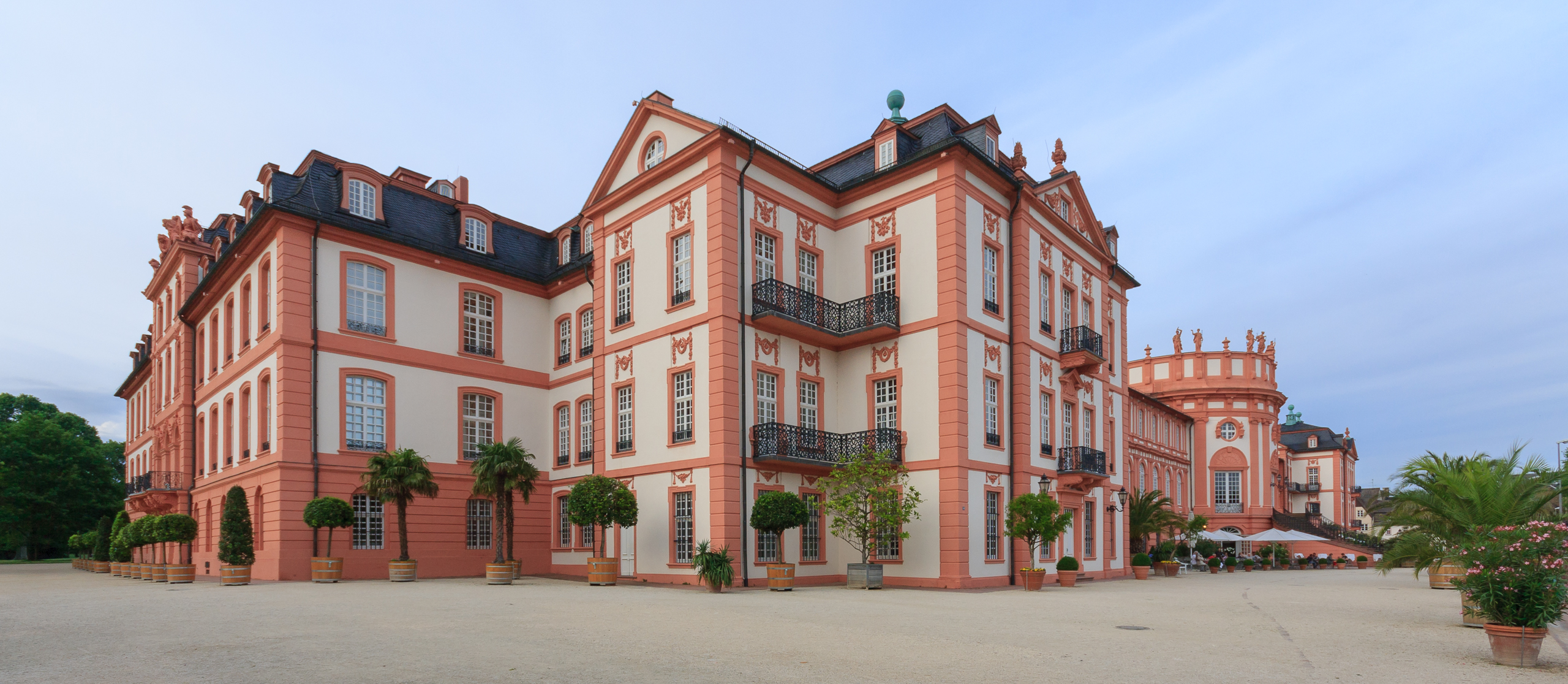
- Interactive map of the Biebrich Palace area

General information
- Type: Palace
- Architectural style: Baroque
- Location: Wiesbaden-Biebrich, Germany
- Coordinates: 50°2′15″N 8°14′3″E
- Construction started: 1702

Design and construction
- Architect: Julius Ludwig Rothweil

Renovating team
- Architect: Maximilian von Welsch

Biebrich Palace (German: Schloss Biebrich) is a Baroque residence (Schloss) in the borough of Biebrich in the city of Wiesbaden, Hesse, Germany. Built in 1702 by Prince Georg August Samuel of Nassau-Idstein, it served as the ducal residence for the independent Duchy of Nassau from 1816 until 1866.

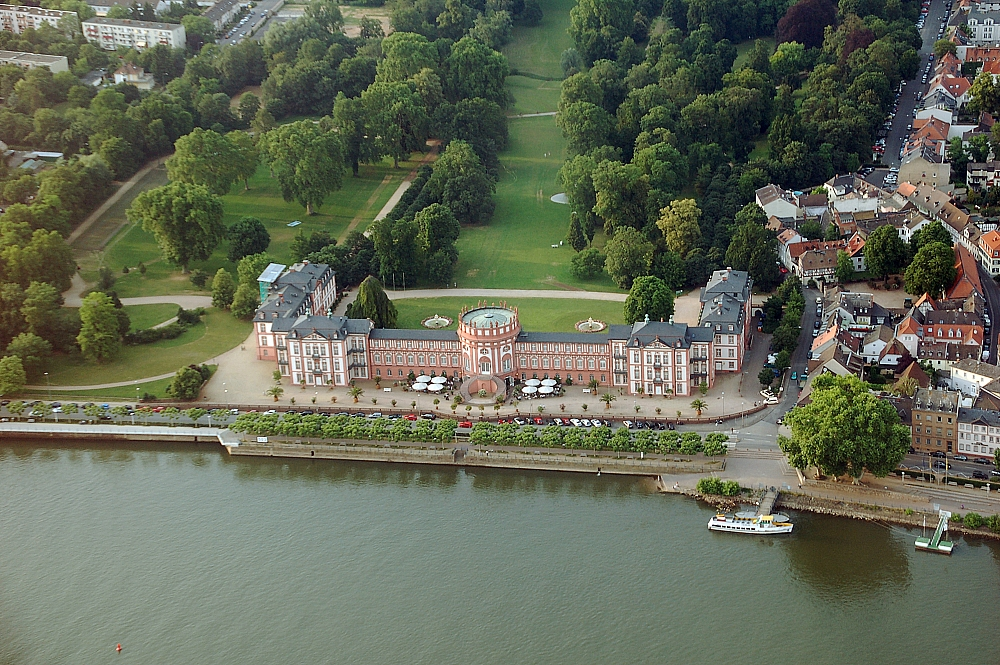
Biebrich palace and park

== History ==
Count Georg August Samuel of Nassau-Idstein, appointed Prince in 1688, wanted a more impressive seat of authority than his palace in Idstein in the Taunus. He moved first to Wiesbaden, and later to Biebrich (at that time a separate community from Wiesbaden). In the immediate vicinity of the Rhine, opposite the Biebricher Wörth, he began construction of a chateau. The structure was designed by the Baroque architect Julius Ludwig Rothweil and was completed in 1702. It survives today as the West Pavilion of the palace. Only four years later, a duplicate structure was built only 86 meters to the east. While the West Pavilion was reserved for the prince and his entourage, the East Pavilion served his wife.

Prince Georg August Samuel began further development of the castle in 1707. Baroque architect Johann Maximilian von Welsch linked the two pavilions with a gallery and built a circular ballroom in the exact center. The Rotunda was completed in 1721, giving Biebrich Castle its distinctive appearance.

After the death of Georg August Samuel, the House of Nassau-Idstein was extinguished and the castle came into the possession of the line of Nassau-Usingen. Prince Karl von Nassau-Usingen decided after his inauguration in 1734 to relocate his permanent residence to Biebrich. Such a residential and government office demanded further premises, so the Baroque architect Friedrich Joachim Stengel designed today's eastern wing. Only three years later, Stengel built the identical western wing. The gardens were designed by landscape architect Friedrich Ludwig von Sckell in 1817 at the request of Duke Wilhelm of Nassau.

Charlotte, Grand Duchess of Luxembourg, sold the palace to the State of Prussia in 1935. Heavily damaged during World War II, it was renovated and partly reconstructed between 1980 and 1982 by the State of Hesse. It is now used by the state government for representation purposes and houses the state's historic preservation agency.

== See also ==
- Stadtschloss Wiesbaden
