= William Henry, Prince of Nassau-Usingen =

Prince of Nassau-Usingen (1702-1718)

William Henry of Nassau-Usingen
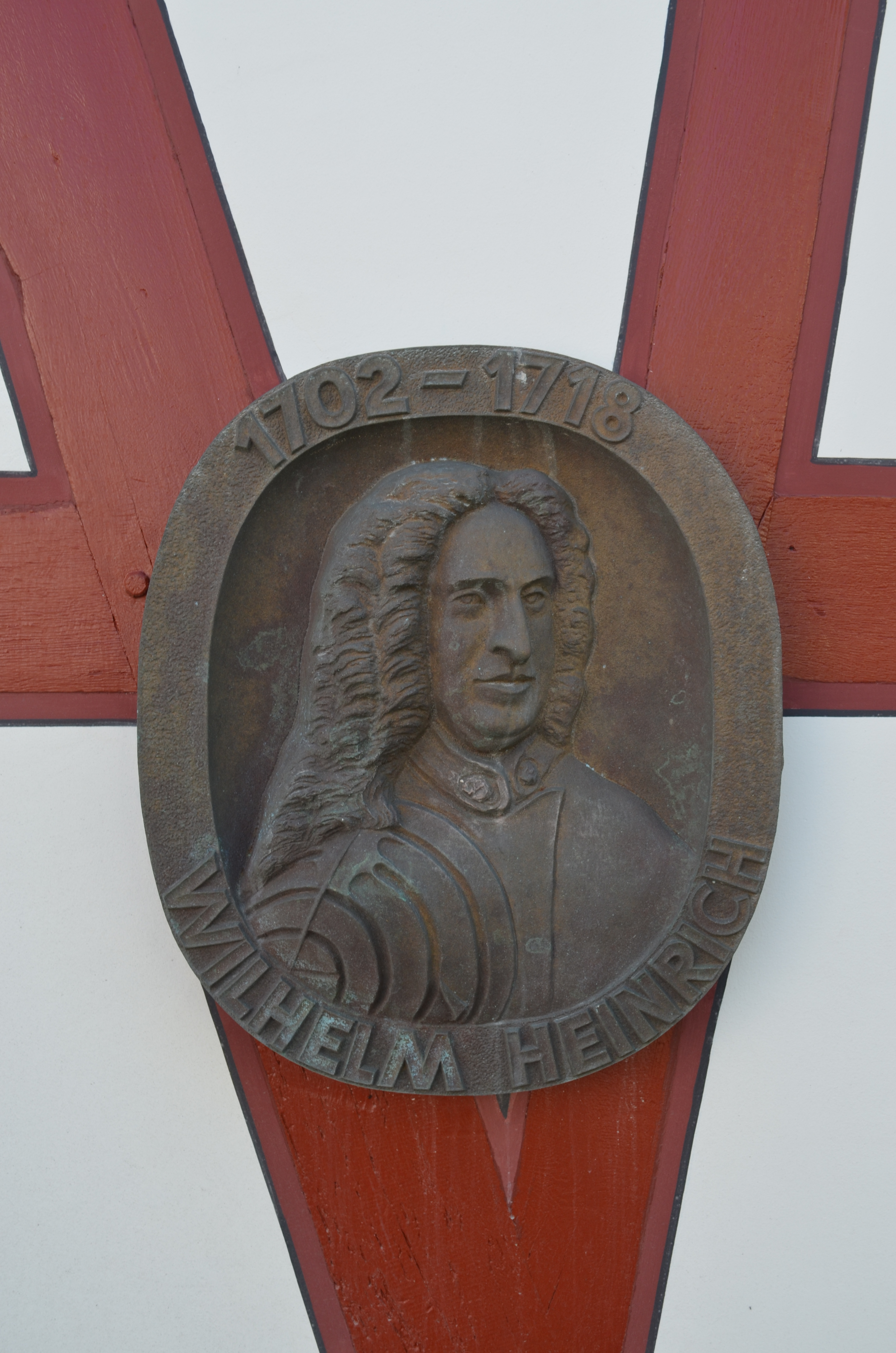
- Born: 2 May 1684 's-Hertogenbosch
- Died: 14 February 1718 (aged 33); Usingen
- Noble family: House of Nassau
- Spouse: Charlotte Amalia of Nassau-Dillenburg
- Father: Walrad, Prince of Nassau-Usingen
- Mother: Catherine Françoise, comtesse de Croÿ-Roeulx

Prince William Henry of Nassau-Usingen (born 2 May 1684 in 's-Hertogenbosch; died: 14 February 1718 in Usingen) was Prince of Nassau-Usingen from 1702 to 1718.

== Parents ==
William Henry was the son of Prince Walrad of Nassau-Usingen and his wife, Catherine Françoise, comtesse de Croÿ-Roeulx.

== Marriage and issue ==
William Henry married Charlotte Amalia (1680–1738), daughter of Henry, Prince of Nassau-Dillenburg, on 15 April 1706. They had nine children, five of which died within the first year: Henry (1708–1708), Amélie (1709–1709), William (1710–1710), Louis (1714–1714), and Johanna (1715–1716). Four children reached adulthood:

- Françoise (1707–1750)
- Charles, Prince of Nassau-Usingen (1712–1775)
- Hedwig (1714–1786)
- William Henry, Prince of Nassau-Saarbrücken (1718–1768)

After he died in 1718, he was succeeded by his underage son Charles as Prince of Nassau-Usingen. Charlotte Amalie reigned as regent until Charles came of age.

== Legacy ==
In 1707, William Henry founded the village of Wilhemsdorf, which was named after him. It was annexed by neighbouring Usingen in 1972.

== Military career ==
Like his father, William Henry had a career in the Dutch army. In 1691, he became a captain and then the colonel of the Walloon Regiment from 1701 to 1707. He was wounded in the Battle of Ekeren on 30 June 1703.

William Henry, Prince of Nassau-Usingen House of Nassau Born: 2 May 1684 Died: 14 February 1718
Preceded by Walrad	Prince of Nassau-Usingen; 1702–1718	Succeeded by Charles
