= Walrad, Prince of Nassau-Usingen =

Prince of Nassau-Usingen (1635–1702)

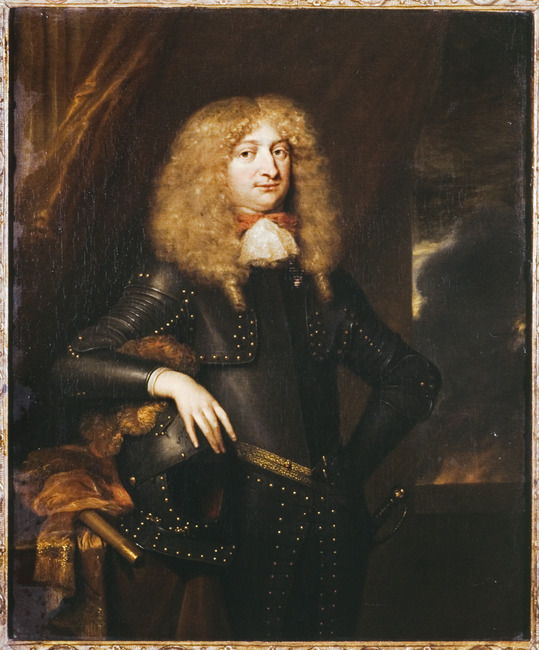
- Prince Walrad of Nassau-Usingen
- Born: 25 February 1636; Roermond
- Died: 17 October 1702 (aged 66); Usingen
- Noble family: House of Nassau
- Spouses: Catherine Françoise, Comtesse de Croÿ-Roeulx; Magdalena Elizabeth, Countess of Löwenstein-Wertheim-Rochefort
- Issue: William Henry, Prince of Nassau-Usingen
- Father: William Louis, Count of Nassau-Saarbrücken
- Mother: Anna Amalia of Baden-Durlach

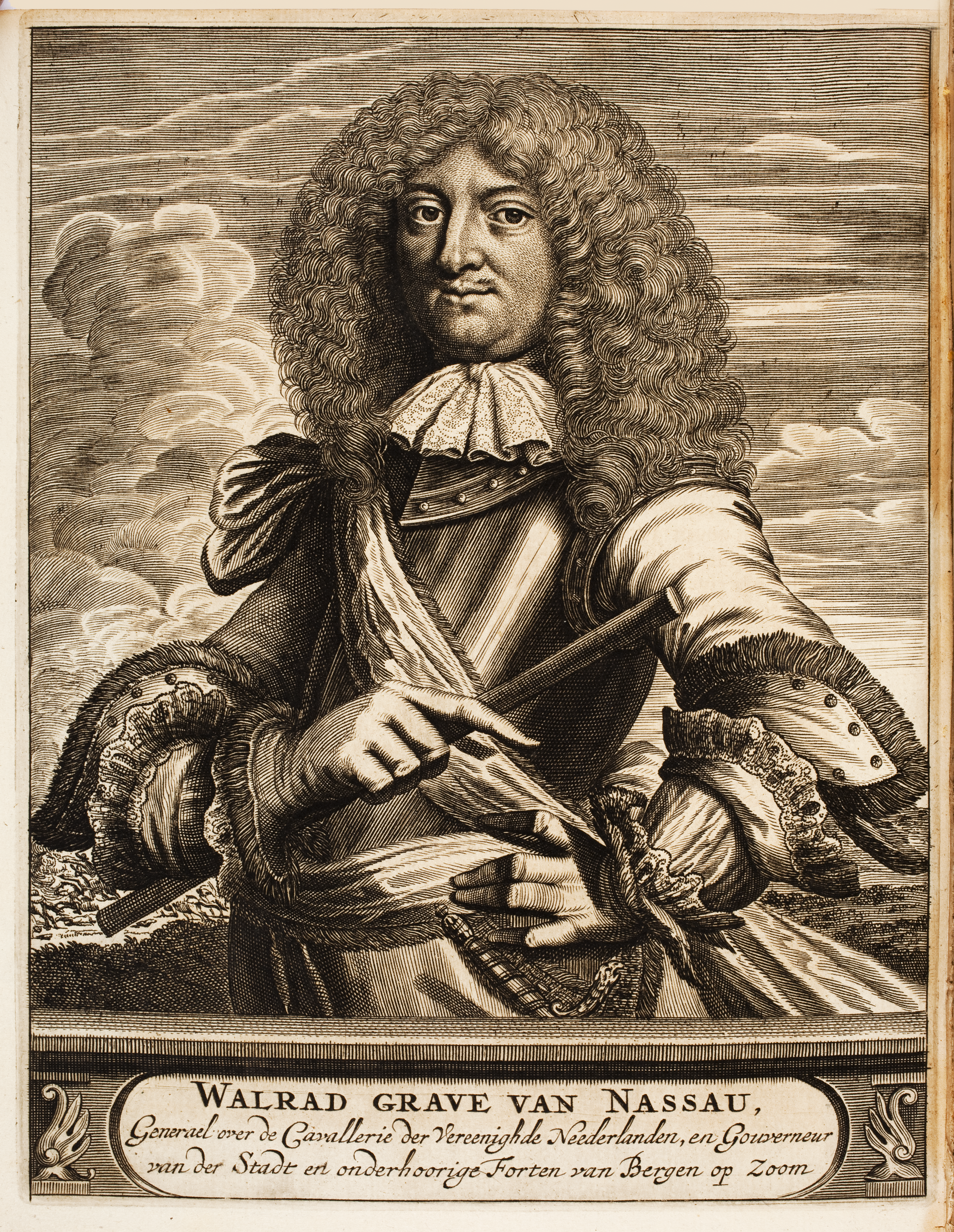
Walrad, Prince of Nassau-Usingen

Walrad of Nassau-Usingen (25 February 1635 in Roermond – 17 October 1702 in Usingen), was from 1659 Count, and from 1688 Prince of Nassau-Usingen and founder of Usingen line of the House of Nassau. He served for most of his career as a general in the Dutch States Army.

== Family ==
He was the youngest son of Count William Louis of Nassau-Saarbrücken and Anna Amalia of Baden-Durlach, daughter of the Margrave George Frederick of Baden-Durlach.

== Military career ==
Walrad was a respected military leader. At different times, he was General Field Marshal of the Holy Roman Empire of German Nation and of the United Provinces of the Netherlands under Prince William III of Orange. In 1664, he hurried to Szentgotthárd, but he came too late to fight in the Battle of Saint Gotthard. In 1683, he fought successfully in the battle to lift the Turkish siege of Vienna. So he had a role in ensuring that the Islamic conquest of Central Europe by the Ottomans failed. For these feats, King John III Sobieski of Poland granted him the Order of the White Eagle, the highest Polish distinction.

Walrad also fought in the War of the Palatine Succession. From 1696, he commanded the Dutch troops. On 1 July 1690, he fought in the Battle of Fleurus and on 3 August 1692 the Battle of Steenkerke. He commanded the left wing of the allied army in the Battle of Landen (1693).

During the War of the Spanish Succession, he was tasked with implementing the imperial ban against Elector Joseph Clemens of Cologne, who had sided with France against the Empire. To this end, he commanded the allied troops at the Siege of Kaiserswerth in 1702.

== Creation of Nassau-Usingen ==
Prince William Louis left three sons, who divided the Nassau territories on 31 March 1659 divided area: John Louis received Ottweiler, Gustav Adolph kept Saarbrücken and Walrad received Usingen and became the founder of a new branch.

Walrad was elevated to the rank of prince in 1688. After his death in 1702, he was succeeded as Prince of Nassau-Usingen by his son William Henry.

== Legacy in Usingen ==
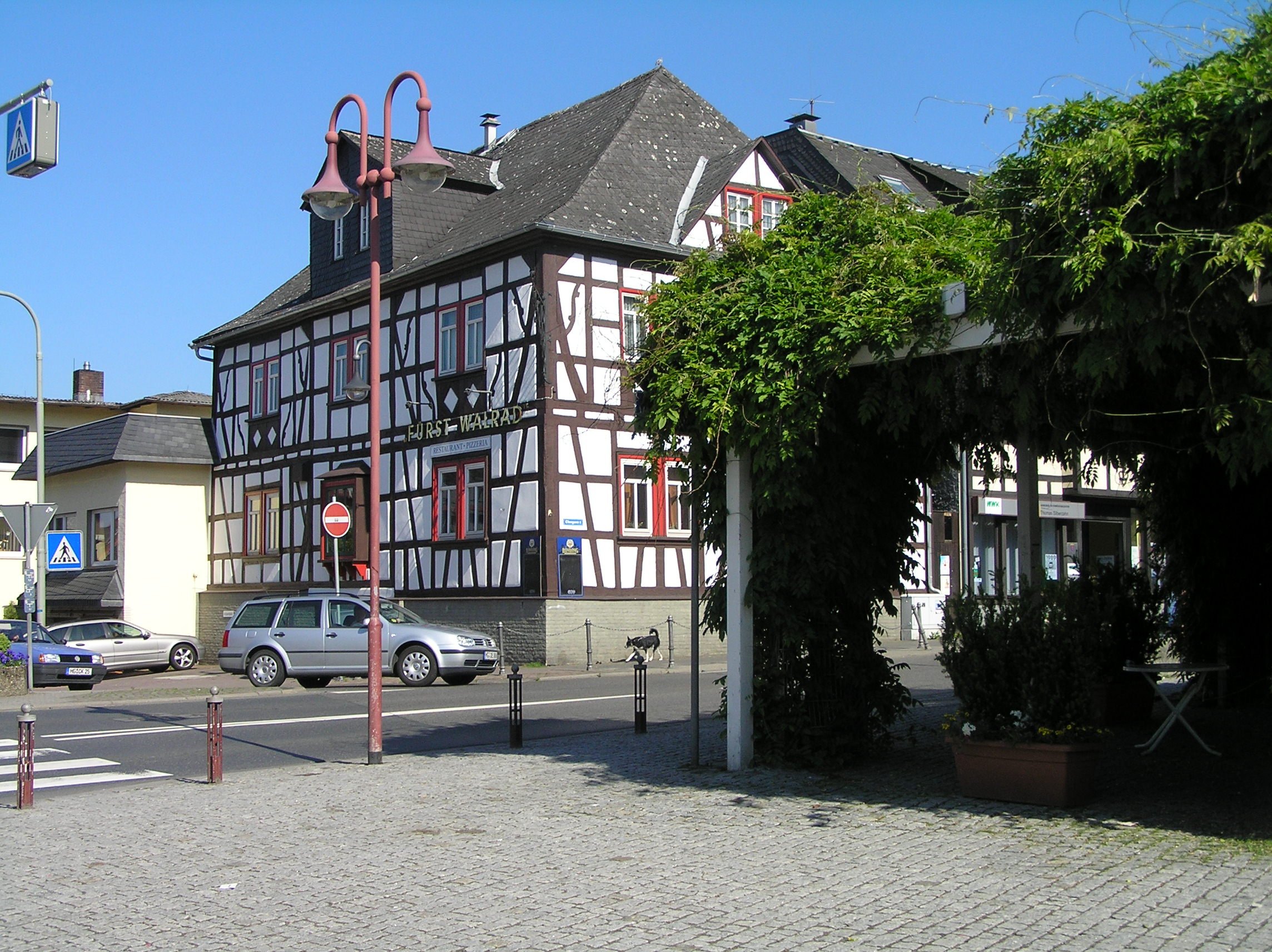
Restaurant Prince Walrad in Usingen

From 1659, the residence of the Usingen branch of House of Nassau was in the town of Usingen in the Taunus mountains. The town gained significantly in prestige and importance by being the seat of a Nassau and also benefited from Walrad's urban construction zeal. Between 1660 and 1663, Walrad replace the old Usingen Castle by a new palace. In 1905, the grateful city council erected a monument for Walrad in the palace gardens (now a public park).

In 1692 a fire destroyed large parts of Usingen. Walrad used this circumstance control to the systematic reconstruction of the upper town of Usingen. He designed the symmetrical streets that characterize the cityscape today were and built representative buildings along the high street.

The population of the country around Usingen had been decimated in the Thirty Years' War. Walrad promoted the influx of Huguenots who had to flee from France, and granted them freedom of religion. The Huguenot Church in Usingen is evidence of this migration.

== Marriage and issue ==
Walrad's first marriage was with Catherine Françoise, Comtesse de Croÿ-Roeulx. This marriage produced three children who survived to adulthood:

- Wilhelmine Henriette (1679-1718) Married Count Carl Ludwig Friedrich von Salm (No Issues)
- William Henry (1684-1718)
- Maria Albertine (1686-1768) Married John George (1702–1725), son of George Philip Count of Ortenburg

After the death of his first wife, he married his second wife, Magdalena Elizabeth, Countess of Löwenstein-Wertheim-Rochefort. This marriage remained childless.

== Works ==
- Vorgeschlagene Conditiones Für die Vbergebung der Vestung Käyserswerth, Statt, Schlosses und angehörigen Schäntzen sowohl dieß- alß jenseith des Rheins, S.L. Düsseldorf, Beyers, 1702 digitized

== Notes ==
Walrad, Prince of Nassau-Usingen House of Nassau Born: 25 February 1635 Died: 17 October 1702
Preceded by William Louis as Count of Nassau-Saarbrücken	Prince of Nassau-Usingen; 1659-1702	Succeeded by William Henry
