= Nassau Family Pact =

1783 succession pact of Luxembourg's ducal family

The Nassau Family Pact was a mutual pact of inheritance and succession made in 1783 by princes of the House of Nassau. It confirmed that Salic Law was to operate in favor of all the agnatic lines of the family, specifically the two senior surviving lines which had originated in the Middle Ages, the Walramian and the Ottonian. The pact chiefly provided that in case of one of these lines becoming extinct, the other would succeed in its hereditary Nassau lands ("the main concept of the pact was that if either the Ottonian or Walramian male line would become extinct the other line would succeed").

There was a clause to provide for a so-called Semi-Salic continuation to the dynasty in an undefined way if both the lines were to die out in the male line ("also arranged for that in the absence of all male successors, females could succeed"). In case of the extinction of all male lines, the closest heir to the last male will succeed and in turn will be succeeded by the heirs of that closest one. If the closest heir happens to be a woman, the pact was silent about whether her husband receives rights or not. There was no precise stipulation as to what precisely was to happen after that closest heir: would the succession evolve to heirs general, or only to heirs male, and what would happen if that line also died out.

The pact was agreed to be applied to "Imperial fiefs" which meant those territories owned or acquired in the then Holy Roman Empire. The pact thus in 1890 determined the succession of the Grand Duchy of Luxembourg, a territory acquired into the dynasty only after the pact was sealed, but in exchange for the handing of some of the Nassau-lands of the Ottonian branch to Prussia and that at the time became a member of the German Confederation, a body that was regarded as the successor to the Holy Roman Empire. The pact did not apply to the succession in the Kingdom of the Netherlands, a state not regarded as formerly German. Luxembourg was thus inherited by the Weilburg branch, the only extant branch from that date onward.

In 1907, the Grand Duke of Luxembourg, William IV, head of the House of Nassau, determined that the branch of the Count of Merenberg was, as morganatic, incapable to succeed to the sovereignty of the House of Nassau. This effectively meant that the Grand Duke himself was then the only surviving agnate of the House.

Having himself only daughters, he felt the need to organize the succession further and remedy some of the undefined points. In April 1907 the Grand Duke decreed (approved in July 1907 by legislature of Luxembourg and thereafter enacted) amendments to the house law of Nassau. The succession law thus amended governs the current succession in Luxembourg, and apparently the succession specifically provided by the pact itself is fulfilled and its impact is exhausted.

Marie-Adélaïde succeeded according to the 1907 law, an outcome that was identical with the stipulations of the pact.

Were any successions of the House of Nassau outside Luxembourg to need to be adjudicated afterwards, it is unclear what the pact would provide — whether a line identical with that of modern Luxembourg's, or different.
