= St. Louis Church =

The Church of St Louis, Church of St. Louis, Church of Saint Louis, St. Louis Church and variants, including Dutch: Heilige Lodewijkkerk, French: Église Saint-Louis, German: Ludwigskirche or Kirche St. Ludwig, Italian: Chiesa di San Luigi, and Portuguese: Igreja São Luiz, mostly intended for Saint Louis, Louis IX of France, may refer to:

== Brazil ==
- Igreja Matriz São Luiz Rei, Ipê

== France ==
- Church of Saint Louis, Grenoble
- Church of St Louis, Marseille
- Church of St Louis, Rouen

== Germany ==
The primary topic is Ludwigskirche in Saarbrücken (the "Ludwig" refers to the founder, not to the saint)

- Ludwigskirche, Munich
- St. Ludwig's Church, Celle

== Italy ==
- Chiesa di San Luigi dei Francesi (in English, Church of St Louis of the French), Rome
- Chiesa di San Luigi Gonzaga, Corteranzo, Murisengo (dedicated to Saint Aloysius Gonzaga)
- Chiesa di San Luigi Gonzaga, Milan (dedicated to Saint Aloysius Gonzaga)

== Netherlands ==
- Heilige Lodewijkkerk, Leiden

== Russia ==
- Church of St. Louis of the French (Moscow)

== South Africa ==
- St Louis Roman Catholic Church, Clairwood

== United States ==
- St. Louis Church (Fall River, Massachusetts)
- St. Louis Church (Louisville, Ohio)
- St. Louis Church (Caledonia, Wisconsin)
- St. Louis Roman Catholic Church
