= Schloss Jägersberg =

Palace in Neunkirchen, Germany

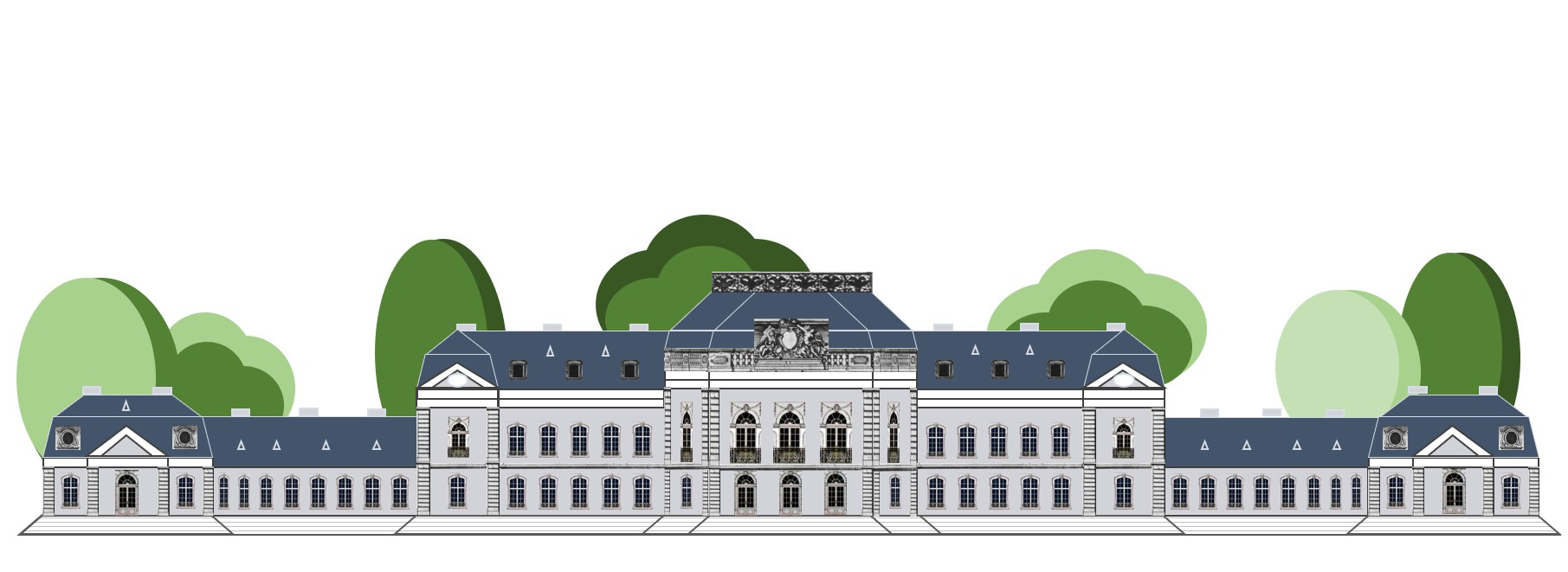
Modern reconstruction of Schloss Jägersberg

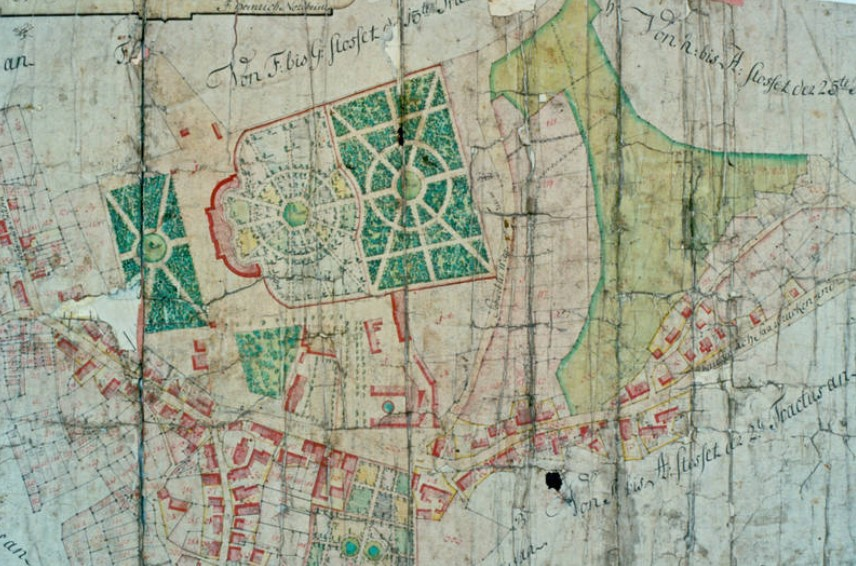
Plan from 1797 showing the location of Jägersberg palace and its gardens within Neunkirchen

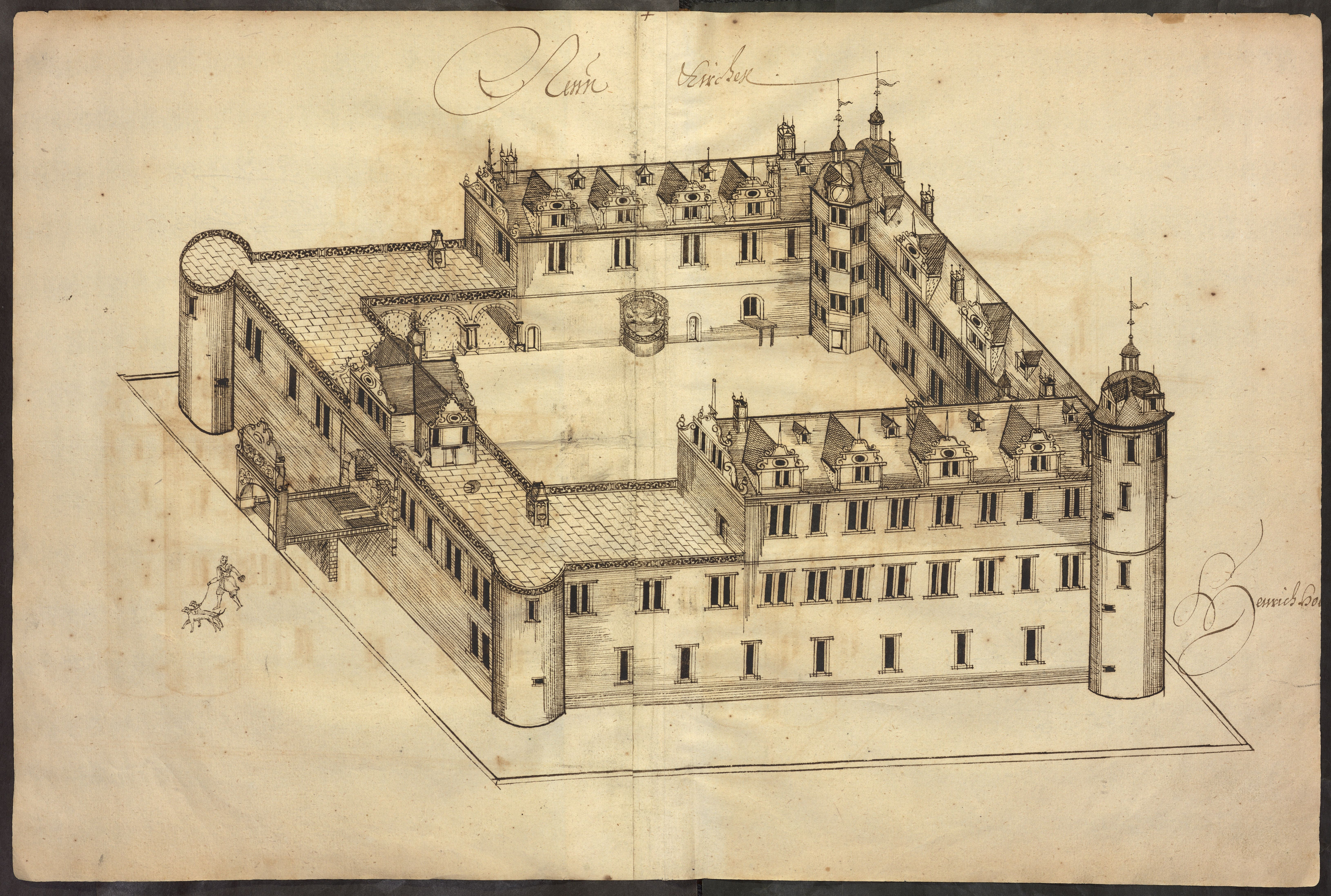
The old renaissance castle of Neunkirchen, which was partially demolished in order to construct Jägersberg palace

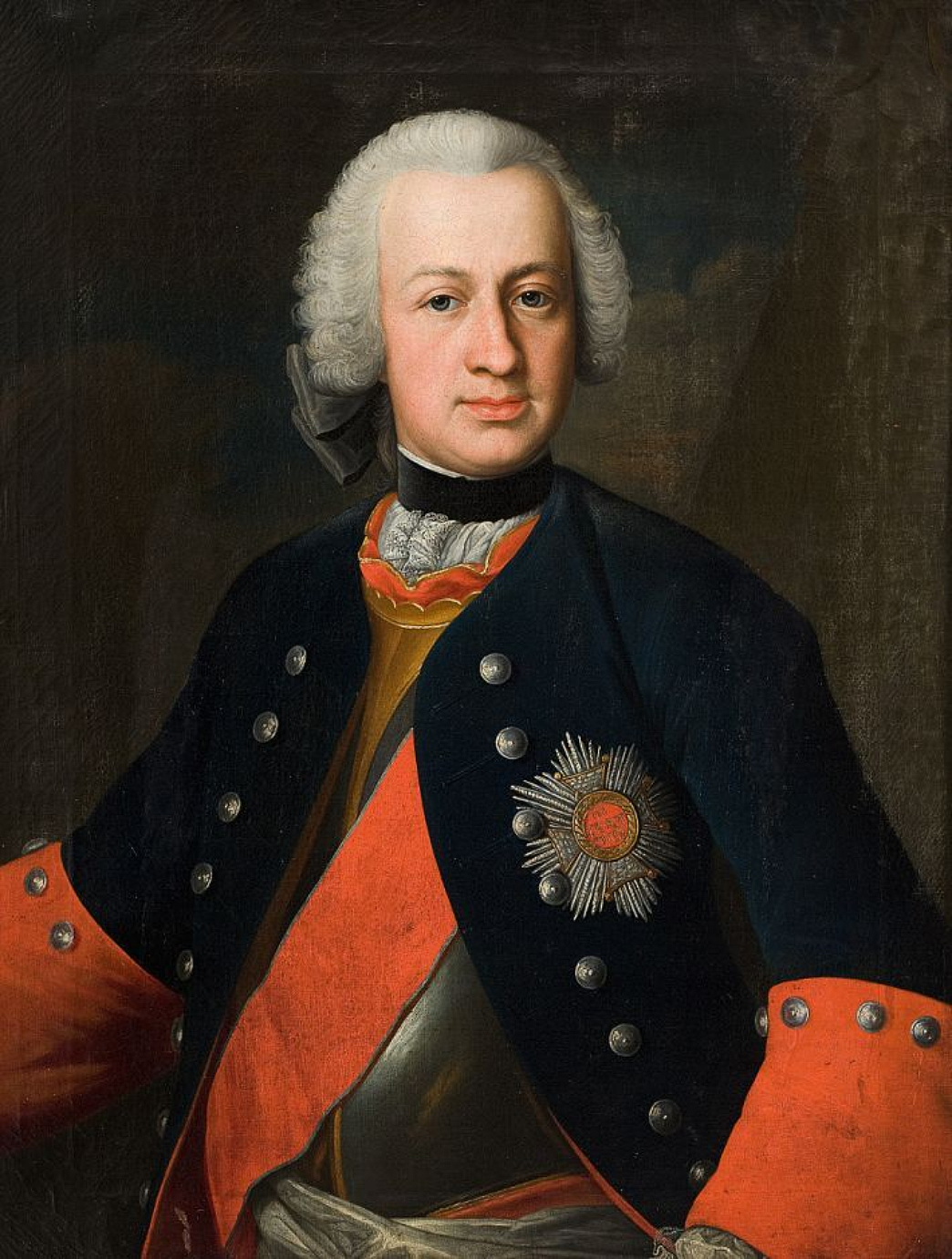
Prince Wilhelm Henry of Nassau-Saarbrücken

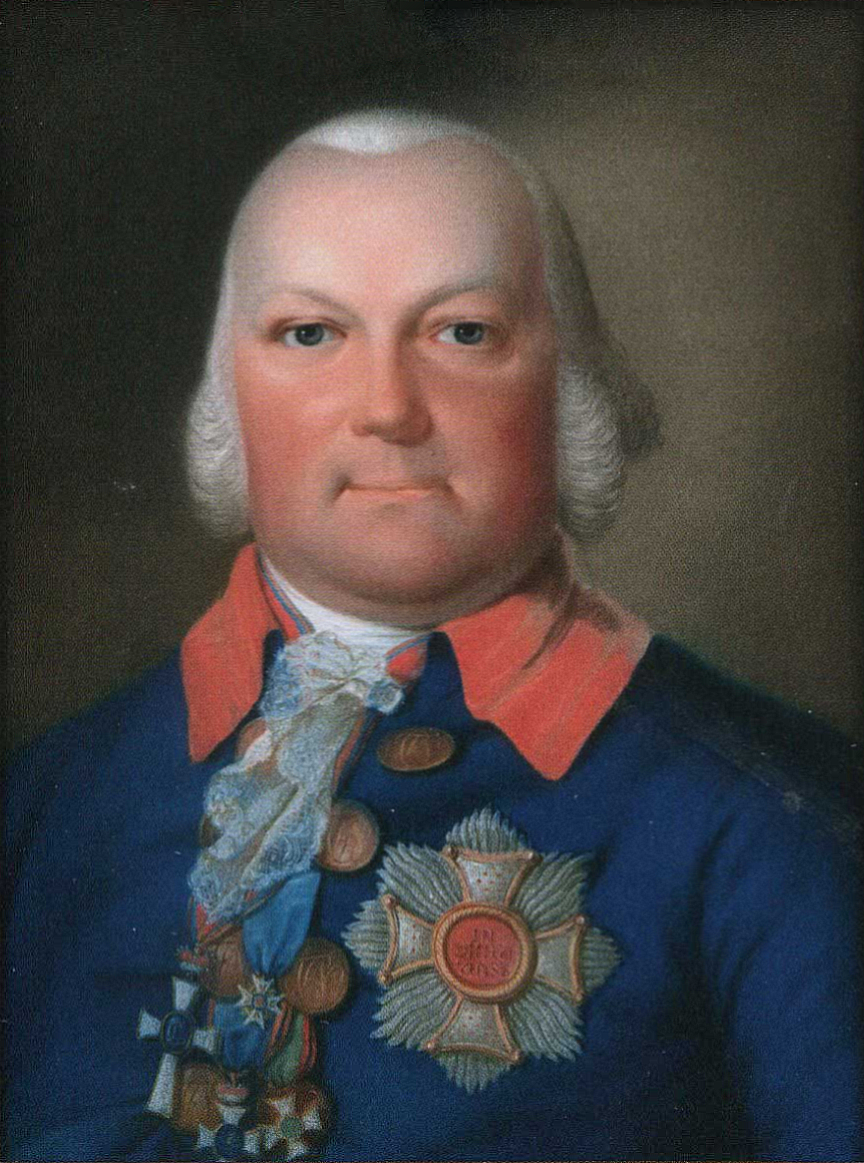
Prince Louis of Nassau-Saarbrücken

Schloss Jägersberg (German: Schloss Jägersberg)(English: Jägersberg palace) was a baroque Schloss in Neunkirchen in Saarland, Germany. It served as a hunting lodge and summer palace for the princes of Nassau-Saarbrücken. Designed by architect Friedrich Joachim Stengel in 1752, it was destroyed between 1793 and 1822. Except some small remains, nothing is left of the palace and its garden.

== History ==
In the second half of the sixteenth century, John III, Count of Nassau-Saarbrücken constructed the first castle in Neunkirchen: a quadrangular building with a tower on each corner. It was primarily used as a hunting lodge.

William Henry, Prince of Nassau-Saarbrücken decided to create a new hunting lodge, Schloss Jägersberg. He engaged Friedrich Joachim Stengel as architect. The first plans probably existed as early as 1749. The final design was made in 1752, and construction started in 1753. Building works continued at least until 1765.

The palace was designed in a half-moon shape, with a two-storey main building and a five-axial central projection. The palace had a terraced garden in English landscape garden style, which extended to the Blies river. The old castle was partially demolished to create a grand entrance to the new palace, and the remaining part was turned into stables.

All documents, invoices, plans, designs and plans relating the construction are considered lost. Probably, they were destroyed during the 1793 fire of Saarbrücken Castle, where the entire administration of the principality was located at that time. Nothing is known about the craftsmen and artists involved in the construction work either.

The palace was primarily used for hunting and festivities, such as the six-day party in honor of the wedding of Prince Louis and Princess Wilhelmine of Schwarzburg-Rudolstadt. On 23 August 1777, prince Louis officially named the palace ‘Jägersberg’ (English: Hunters mountain). Initially, it was called the new castle (German: Neues Schloss Neunkirchen).

During the French revolutionary wars, the principality was occupied by France. In 1792, Schloss Jägersberg served as a last refuge for the princely family for a period of a half year. The palace was plundered and set on fire by French troops in May 1793, when prince Louis already left for Aschaffenburg, where he died in 1794. Crown prince Henry was still there, but was able to save himself by jumping over the wall. Seven-year old princess Catherine was left behind, captured and brought back to Saarbrücken. She later vividly remembers that the palace is looted and set afire.

In 1802, an English nobleman, colonel Thomas Thornton, wanted to purchase the ruins and restore the baroque palace. However, he was unable to realized these plans. It is said that he partially rented afterwards the Château de Chambord in the Loire valley. Schloss Jägersberg remained in ruins until 1822. After its gradual decay, it was demolished. The grounds were parcelled out and partially built over.

Today, only some fragments of the palace and the gardens are preserved. They are located in the city centre of Neunkirchen, in the area of the Schlossstrasse, Seilerstrasse, and Kochgasse. Some of the remains are integrated in modern buildings, such as an Irish pub and a residential house. The fragments are protected as cultural heritage monuments by the state of Saarland.

=== Visit by Johann Wolfgang von Goethe ===
In 1770, Johann Wolfgang von Goethe visited Jägersberg palace. He writes about his visit to Neunkirchen in his book Dichtung und Wahrheit:

Nevertheless, some pleasant adventures, and a surprising firework at nightfall, not far from Neukirch, interested us young fellows almost more than these important experiences. For as a few nights before, on the banks of the Saar, shining clouds of glow-worms hovered around us, betwixt rock and thicket; so now the spark-spitting forges played their sprightly firework towards us. We passed, in the depth of night, the smelting-houses situated in the bottom of the valley, and were delighted with the strange half -gloom of these dens of plank, which are but dimly lighted by a little opening in the glowing furnace. The noise of the water, and of the bellows driven by it; the fearful whizzing and shrieking of the blast of air, which, raging into the smelted ore, stuns the hearing and confuses the senses, — drove us away, at last, to turn into Neukirch, which is built up against the mountain.

But, notwithstanding all the variety and fatigue of the day, I could find no rest here. I left my friend to a happy sleep, and sought the hunting-seat, which lay still farther up. It looks out far over mountain and wood, the outlines of which were only to be recognized against the clear nightsky, but the sides and depths of which were impenetrable to my sight. This well-preserved building stood as empty as it was lonely : no castellan, no huntsman, was to be found. I sat before the great glass doors upon the steps which run around the whole terrace. Here, surrounded by mountains, over a forest-grown, dark soil, which seemed yet darker in contrast with the clear horizon of a summer night, with the glowing, starry vault above me, I sat for a long time by myself on the deserted spot, and thought I never had felt such a solitude. How sweetly, then, was I surprised by the distant sound of a couple of French horns, which at once, like the fragrance of balsam, enlivened the peaceful atmosphere. Then there awakened within me the image of a lovely being, which had retired into the background before the motley objects of these travelling-days, but which now unveiled itself more and more, and drove me from the spot back to my quarters, where I made preparations to set off as early as possible.

== Bibliography ==
- Heinz, Dieter (1954). "Die Rekonstruktion des Neunkircher Barockschlosses". Festschrift für Karl Lohmeyer (in German). Saarbrücken: Ost-West. pp. 176–186.
- Weber, Wilhelm (1987). Schloss Karlsberg : Legende und Wirklichkeit : die Wittelsbacher Schlossbauten im Herzogtum Pfalz-Zweibrücken (in German). Homburg (Pfalz): Ermer Verlag. pp. 87–89. ISBN 978-3924653026.
- Schneider, Ralf (1993). "Barockschloss Jägersberg". In Conrad, Joachim; Flesch, Stefan (eds.). Burgen und Schlösser an der Saar (in German). Saarbrücken: SDV Saarbrücker Druckerei und Verlag. p. 114. ISBN 3-477-00088-9.
- Schneider, Reinhard (2005). "Ein Saarländisch Sanssouci – Das untergegangene neue Schloss in Neunkirchen". In Dittscheid, Hans-Christoph; Güthlein, Klaus (eds.). Die Architektenfamilie Stengel: Friedrich Joachim (1694 – 1787), Johann Friedrich (Fjodor Fjodorowitsch, 1746 – 1830?), Balthasar Wilhelm (1748 – 1824) (in German). Petersberg: Michael Imhof verlag. pp. 123–154. ISBN 978-3937251882.
- Schneider, Reinhard (2005). "Ein Saarländisch Sanssouci – Das untergegangene neue Schloss in Neunkirchen". In Knauf, Rainer; Trepesch, Hans (eds.). Neunkircher Stadtbuch (in German). Neunkirchen. pp. 424–450.
- Minoti, Paul (2005). "Der Garten von Schloss Jägersberg und sein Umfeld". In Knauf, Rainer; Trepesch, Hans (eds.). Neunkircher Stadtbuch (in German). Neunkirchen. pp. 457–470.
- Schlicker, Armin. "Die beiden Neunkircher Schlösser". www.hvsn.de (in German). Neunkirchen: Historischer Verein Stadt Neunkirchen e.V.
- Meiser, Gerd (30 December 2015). "Eine Tür erinnert an die Schlösserzeit". Saarbrücker Zeiting (in German).
