= Louis, Prince of Nassau-Saarbrücken =

Last Prince of Nassau-Saarbrücken

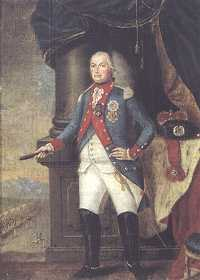
- Louis, Prince of Nassau-Saarbrücken
- Born: 3 January 1745; Saarbrücken
- Died: 2 March 1794 (aged 49); Aschaffenburg
- Buried: St. Lawrence Church in Usingen
- Noble family: House of Nassau
- Spouses: Princess Wilhelmina of Schwarzburg-Rudolstadt; Katharina Kest, Countess of Ottweiler
- Father: William Henry, Prince of Nassau-Saarbrücken
- Mother: Sophie of Erbach-Erbach

Louis, Prince of Nassau-Saarbrücken (3 January 1745 in Saarbrücken – 2 March 1794 in Aschaffenburg) was the last ruling prince of Nassau-Saarbrücken. He ruled from 1768 until the French Revolution.

== Early life ==
Louis was born in Saarbrücken as the second child and first son of William Henry of Nassau-Saarbrücken and his wife Princess Sophie of Erbach-Erbach.

Like his father, he was educated at the University of Strasbourg. His Grand Tour led to England (from 1759 to 1766), and the Netherlands, France, and Germany.

== Career ==
After his father's death in 1768, Louis took up the business of government in Nassau-Saarbrücken. He largely continued his father's economic policies, but was increasingly subject to financial constraints, so that he had to mortgage the Lordship of Jugenheim to the principality of Nassau-Usingen from 1769 until 1777. In 1770, he requested Emperor Joseph to appoint a Debt Commission. This commission was dissolved in 1782. Since his financial position was still tight, Louis moved his seat of government from the palace in Saarbrücken to his smaller hunting lodges in the surrounding area, such as Schloss Jägersberg.

Despite his tight financial position, Louis was able to complete some construction projects. In 1769, he constructed the Ludwigberg palace and garden on the Malstatter Bahn. In 1775, he completed the Ludwigskirche by Friedrich Joachim Stengel, which his father had begun.

He was an enlightened absolutist ruler. He issued new regulations for agriculture and forestry and reformed the school system. He also reformed the penal code and abolished torture.

== Personal life ==
On 30 October 1766 Louis married at Schwarzburg Castle to Princess Wilhelmine of Schwarzburg-Rudolstadt (1751–1780). The marriage was an unhappy one, and Wilhelmine retreated to Halberg Castle, where she raised their son:

- Henry Louis (1768–1797), who married Princess Marie Françoise Maximilienne of Saint Mauris-Montbarrey, the daughter of Prince Alexandre Marie Léonor de Saint-Mauris de Montbarrey, in 1785.

Outside his marriage, Louis fathered two illegitimate children with Baroness Amalie Frederike of Dorsberg, Frederika Louisa (1771), who married François Leclerc d'Alteville, and Louis Charles Philip (1774-1871). On 28 February 1787, he married his maidservant Katharina Kest (1757–1829). Since she was a commoner, Louis rose her to Countess of Ottweiler. From this morganatic marriage, he had seven other children, including his youngest son Adolph:

- Louis Albert (1775–1784)
- Charles Louis (1776–1799)
- Louise (1778–1855)
- Henry (1779–1781)
- Louis (1785–1796)
- Catherine (1786–1818)
- Adolph Louis (1789–1812)

In 1787, the Emperor legitimized their marriage. In 1789, Louis XVI conferred upon Katharina the title Duchess of Dillange.

In 1793, his health was failing when he fled before the French Revolution to Aschaffenburg with his mother. He died there in exile, and was buried in the Evangelical St. Lawrence Church in Usingen. On 23 November 1995, his body was transferred to the Castle Church in Saarbrücken.

== Ancestors ==
Ancestors of Louis, Prince of Nassau-Saarbrücken

16. William Louis, Count of Nassau-Saarbrücken
8. Walrad, Prince of Nassau-Usingen
17. Anna Amalia of Baden-Durlach
4. William Henry, Prince of Nassau-Usingen
18. Eustache III de Croÿ-Roeulx
9. Catherine Françoise de Croÿ-Roeulx
19. Theodora of Ketteler
2. William Henry, Prince of Nassau-Saarbrücken
20. George Louis, Prince of Nassau-Dillenburg
10. Henry, Prince of Nassau-Dillenburg
21. Anna Augusta of Brunswick-Wolfenbüttel
5. Charlotte Amalia of Nassau-Dillenburg
22. George III of Brieg
11. Dorothea Elisabeth of Brieg
23. Sophie Katharina of Münsterberg-Oels
1. Louis, Prince of Nassau-Saarbrücken
24. George Albert I of Erbach-Breuberg
12. George Albert II of Erbach-Fürstenau
25. Elisabeth Dorothea of Hohenlohe-Schillingfürst
6. George William of Erbach
26. Philip Gottfried of Hohenlohe-Waldenburg
13. Anna Dorothea Christina of Hohenlohe-Waldenburg
27. Anna Christine of Limpurg-Sontheim
3. Sophie of Erbach-Erbach
28. Julius August of Bothmer
14. John Caspar of Bothmer
29. Margaret Eleonore of Petersdorf
7. Sophia Charlotte of Bothmer
30. Louis Gebhard of Hoym
15. Gisela Erdmuthe of Hoym
31. Katharina Sophie of Schönfeldt

Louis, Prince of Nassau-Saarbrücken House of Nassau Born: 3 January 1745 Died: 2 March 1794
Preceded by William Henry	Prince of Nassau-Saarbrücken; 1768–94	Succeeded by Henry Louis
