= William Henry, Prince of Nassau-Saarbrücken =

Prince of Nassau-Saarbrücken (1741-1768)

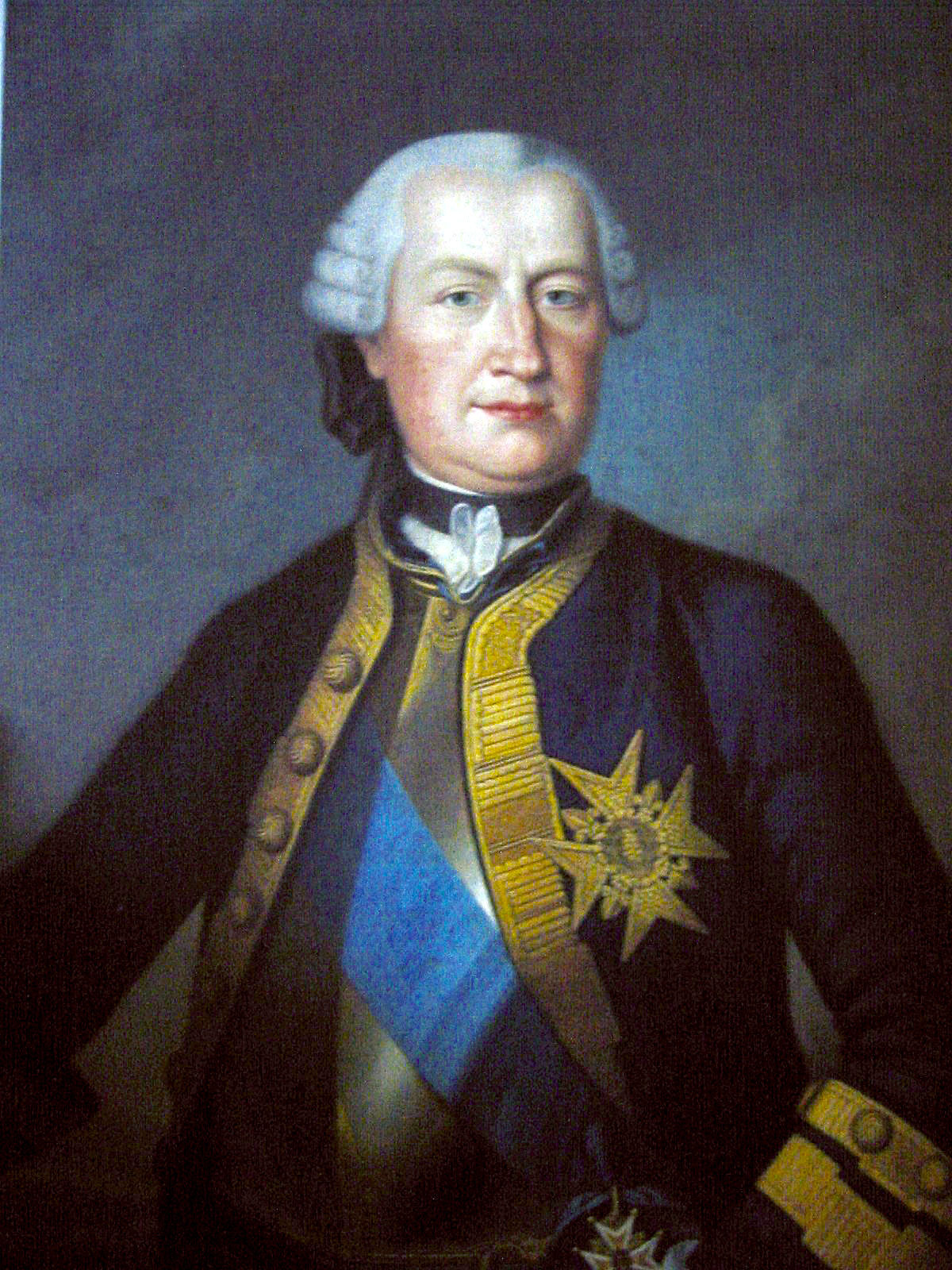
- Born: 6 March 1718; Usingen
- Died: 24 July 1768 (aged 50); Saarbrücken
- Noble family: House of Nassau
- Spouse: Sophie of Erbach-Erbach
- Issue: Louis, Prince of Nassau-Saarbrücken; Princess Anne Caroline; Princess Wilhelmine Henriette
- Father: William Henry, Prince of Nassau-Usingen
- Mother: Charlotte Amalia of Nassau-Dillenburg

William Henry, Prince of Nassau-Saarbrücken (6 March 1718 – 24 July 1768), was Prince of Nassau-Saarbrücken from 1741 until his death.

== Life ==
William Henry was born in Usingen, the fifth son of William Henry of Nassau-Usingen Born and Princess Charlotte Amalia of Nassau-Dillenburg. His father died just weeks before his birth. His mother then acted as guardian and regent until her death in 1738. She provided a comprehensive education and raised her sons in the Calvinist faith. In 1730 and 1731, he and his brother were enrolled at the University of Strasbourg and was taught by various tutors. He probably also studied for a while at the University of Geneva, which was popular among reformed students. His Grand Tour took William Henry to the court of Louis XV in France, among other places.

After his mother's death, his brother Charles acted as regent until William Henry came of age in 1741. In 1741, the brothers decided to divide their inheritance. Charles received Nassau-Usingen on the right bank of the Rhine; William Henry received Nassau-Saarbrücken on the left bank. At the time, Nassau-Saarbrücken measured about 12 square miles and it had 22000inhabitants. This made it one of the smallest principalities in the Holy Roman Empire.

== Politics and economy ==
Shortly after his accession to power, he participated with his Royal-Allemand regiment in the War of the Austrian Succession. In 1742 he sold his regiment to the Landgrave of Hesse-Darmstadt, during his stay in Frankfurt on the occasion of the coronation of Charles VII. During this visit, he also met Princess Sophie of Erbach, his future wife.

He later took part in the Seven Years' War, again with his own troops. He had a close relationship with France, his large neighbour. He often traveled to Paris, where he received military honors—as was usual at the time for ruling nobility—including a promotion to field marshal.

William Henry reformed the administration and justice. He separated these two branches of government and issued some orders typical of the enlightened absolutists of his time. These included a cameralistic economic policy. He took measures to standardize taxes and introduced a modern cadastre on the Austrian model. He also promoted modern agricultural methods, such as the potato cultivation and pest control. He was also involved in coal mining and iron smelting. He nationalized the mines and leased the ironworks to entrepreneurs such as Cerf Beer. He laid the basis for a proto-industrialized economy, which would later evolve into the highly industrialized Saarland region. Despite the increase in revenues, his financial situation did not improve, because of his high spending on construction activities. He died in Saarbrücken.

== Extension of the residence ==
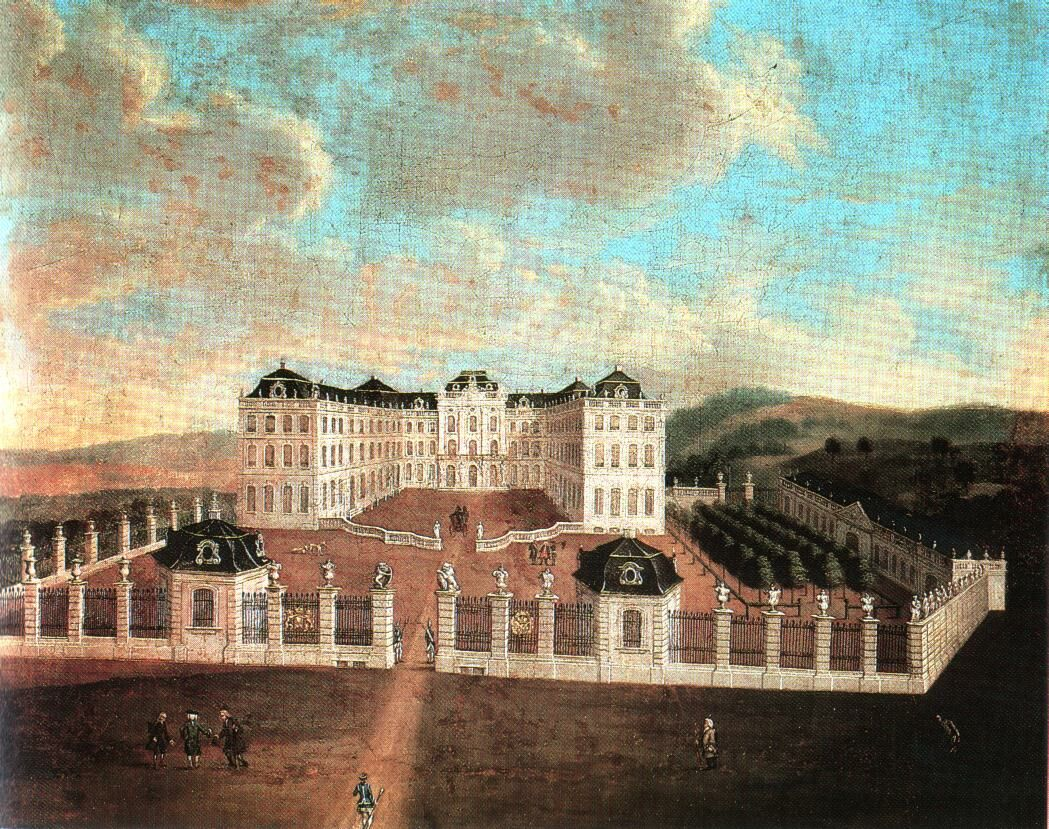
Saarbrücken Castle

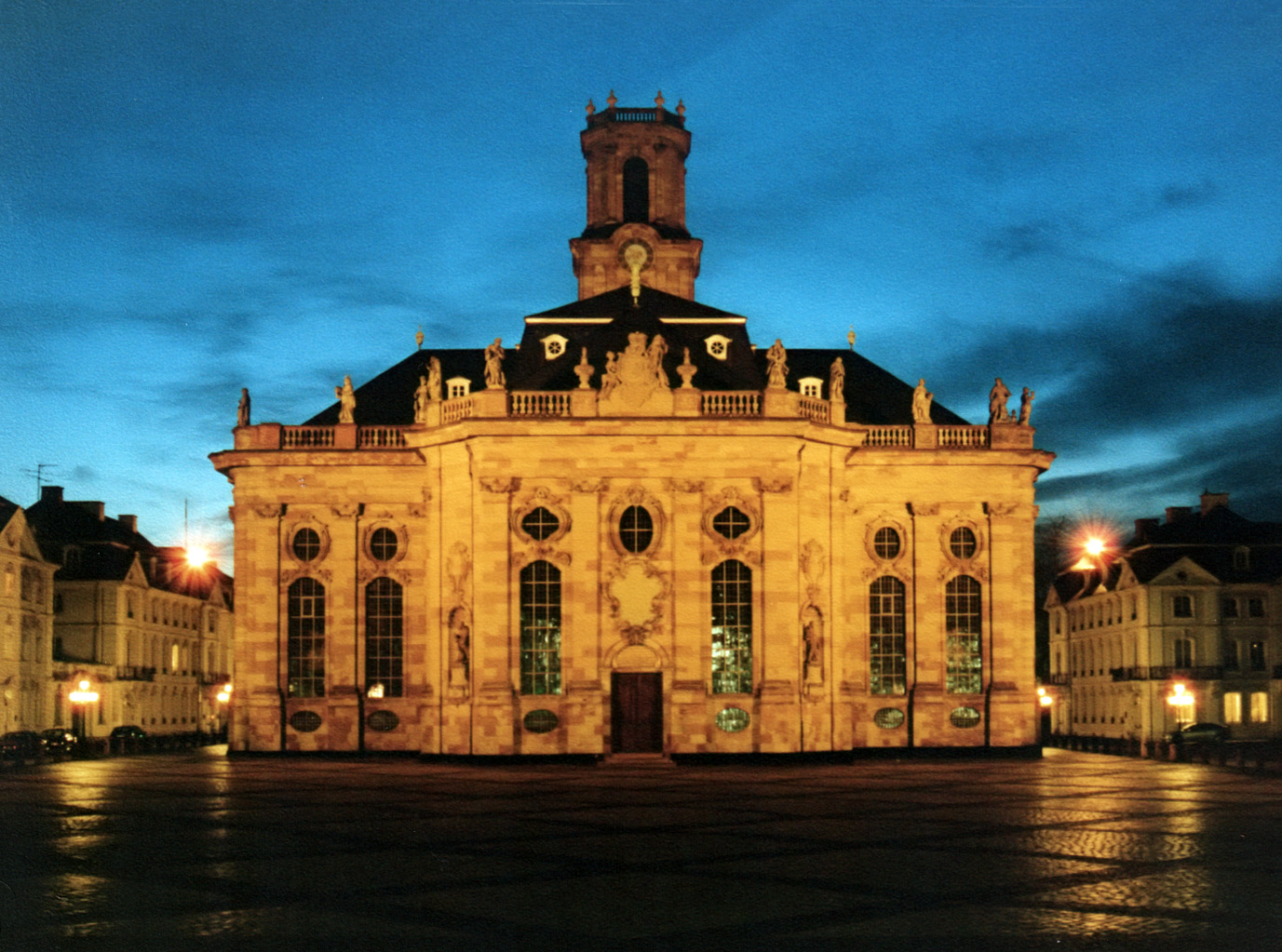
Main entrance of the Louis Church at night

When William Henry's reign began, he and his family and some noble families moved from Usingen to Saarbrücken and he began to develop his capital. The city had been severely affected by the confusion of the Thirty Years' War and the War of the Reunions. It was redesigned and expanded into a baroque capital, especially by the architect Friedrich Joachim Stengel. Noteworthy buildings from this periods are the Saarbrücken Castle, the Louis Church and Basilica of St. John. He also built a number of palaces and town houses. The downside of his magnificent city was an immense debt, which his son and successor Louis had to deal with. Nevertheless, the city of Saarbrücken is still dominated by William Henry's buildings and they keep his memory alive. Also, in the countryside of his principality, he constructed various hunting lodges and residences, such as Schloss Jägersberg.

== William Henry as enlightened absolutist ==
William Henry and his princely contemporaries show the possibilities and limits of an enlightened absolutist policy. As much as he insisted on enlightened principles of legal reforms, continued economic stimulus and the exercise of religious tolerance, he also remained a patriarchal ruler who forbade his subjects to actively participate in government and who tried to regulate all areas of life with an immense flood of regulations, and who suppressed social protests harshly.

== Marriage and issue ==
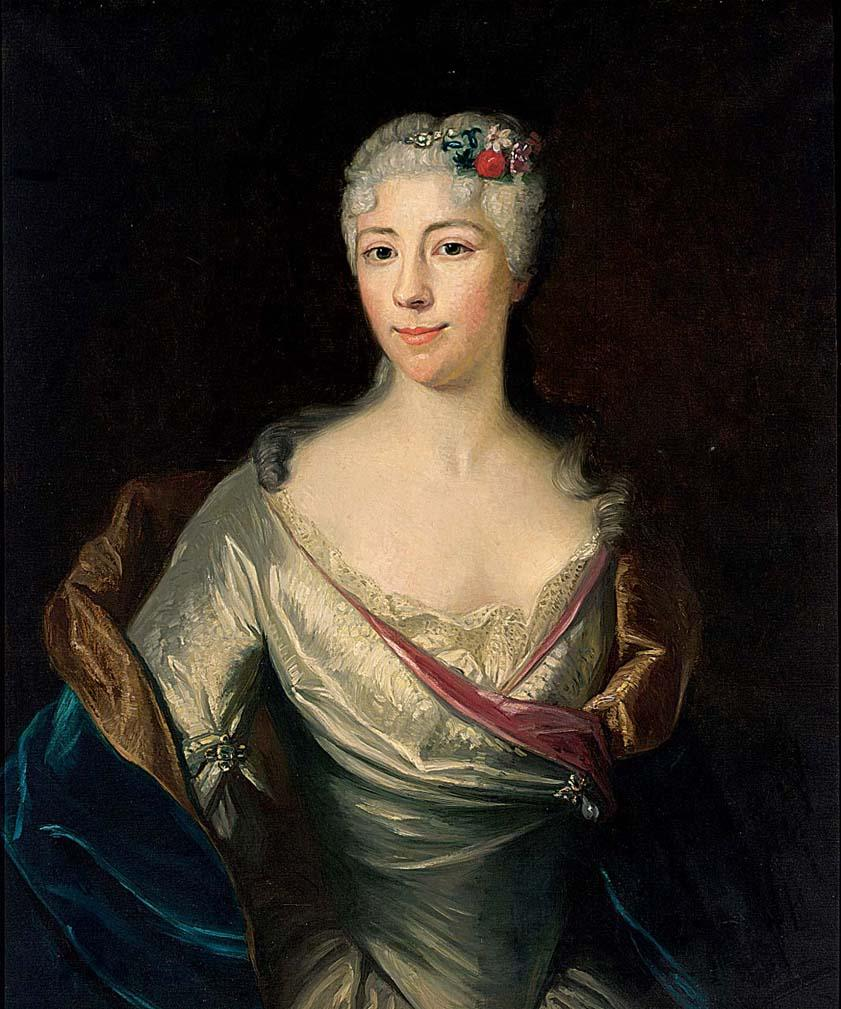
Sophie of Erbach-Erbach, by an unknown artist, c. 1750

William Henry married on 28 February 1742 in Erbach with Sophie (1725–1795), the daughter of Count George William of Erbach and granddaughter of George Albert II, Count of Erbach-Fürstenau. With her, he had the following children:

- Sophie Auguste (1743–1745)
- Louis (1745–1794), Prince of Nassau-Saarbrücken, married Princess Wilhelmina of Schwarzburg-Rudolstadt
- Frederick Augustus (1748–1750)
- Anna Caroline (1751–1824), married:
  1. in 1769 with Duke Frederick Henry of Schleswig-Holstein-Sonderburg-Glücksburg
  2. in 1782 with Duke Frederick Charles Ferdinand of Brunswick-Bevern
- Wilhelmine Henriette (1752–1829)

married in 1783 Louis Armand de Seiglières, Marquis de Soyecourt-Feuquières

== Ancestors ==
Ancestors of William Henry, Prince of Nassau-Saarbrücken

8. William Louis, Count of Nassau-Saarbrücken
4. Walrad, Prince of Nassau-Usingen
9. Anna Amalia of Baden-Durlach
2. William Henry, Prince of Nassau-Usingen
10. Eustache III de Croÿ-Roeulx
5. Catherine Françoise de Croÿ-Roeulx
11. Theodora of Ketteler-Lage
1. William Henry, Prince of Nassau-Saarbrücken
12. George Louis, Prince of Nassau-Dillenburg
6. Henry, Prince of Nassau-Dillenburg
13. Anna Augusta of Brunswick-Wolfenbüttel
3. Charlotte Amalia of Nassau-Dillenburg
14. George III of Brieg
7. Dorothea Elisabeth of Brieg
15. Sophie Katharina of Münsterberg-Oels

== Footnotes ==
William Henry, Prince of Nassau-Saarbrücken House of Nassau Born: 6 March 1718 Died: 24 July 1768
Preceded by Charles as Prince of Nassau-Usingen	Prince of Nassau-Saarbrücken; 1735-1768	Succeeded by Louis
