= Ludwigskirche =

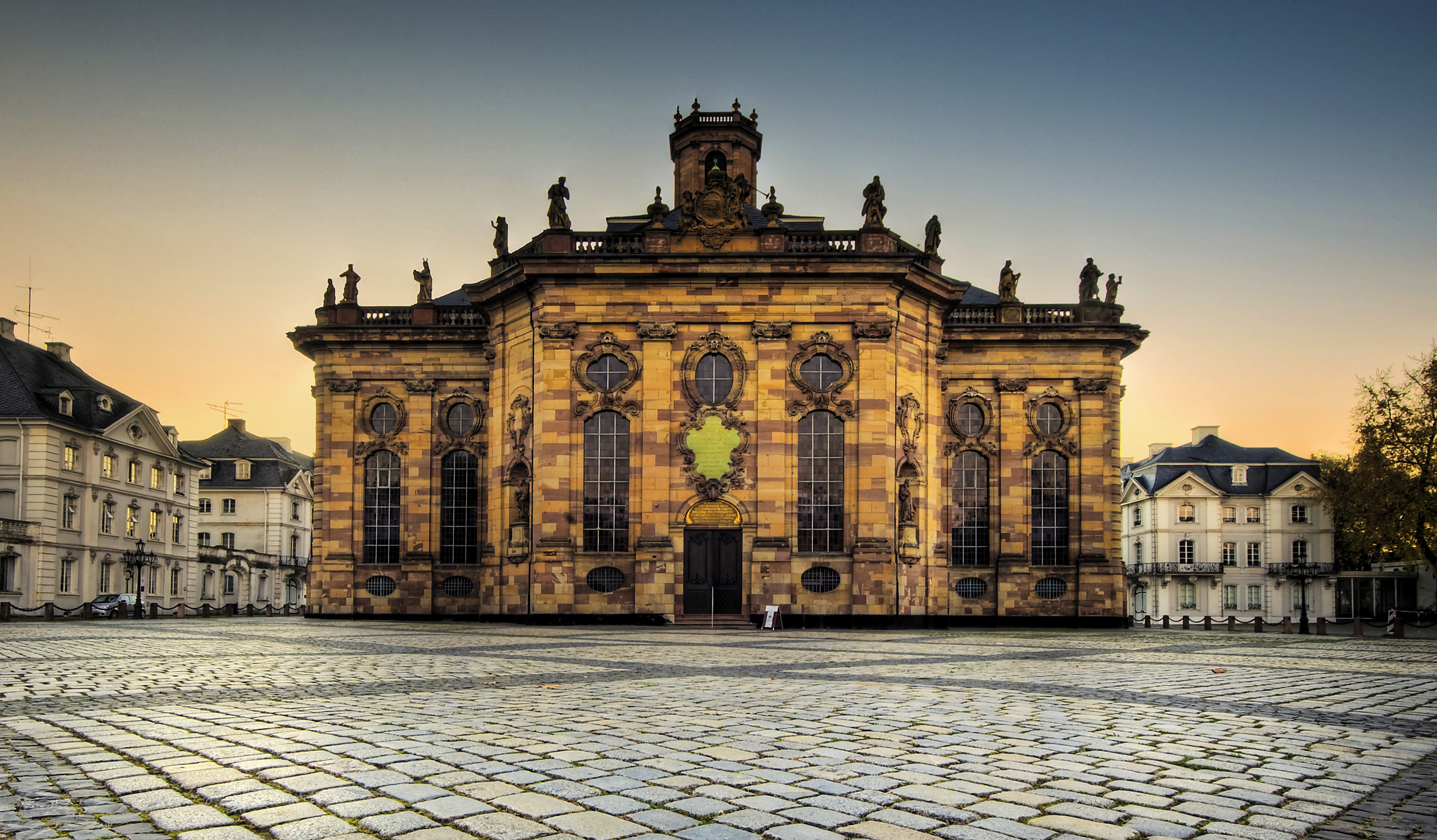
- Ludwigskirche
- Ludwigskirche
- 49°13′58″N 6°59′11″E
- Address: Am Ludwigsplatz 18; Saarbrücken, Germany
- Country: Germany
- Denomination: Lutheran

History
- Consecrated: August 25, 1775

Architecture
- Architect: Friedrich Joachim Stengel
- Style: Baroque
- Years built: 1762–1775

Ludwigskirche in Old Saarbrücken, Germany, is a Lutheran Baroque-style church. It is the symbol of the city and is considered to be one of the most important Protestant churches in Germany, along with the Dresden Frauenkirche and the St. Michael's Church, Hamburg.

== History ==
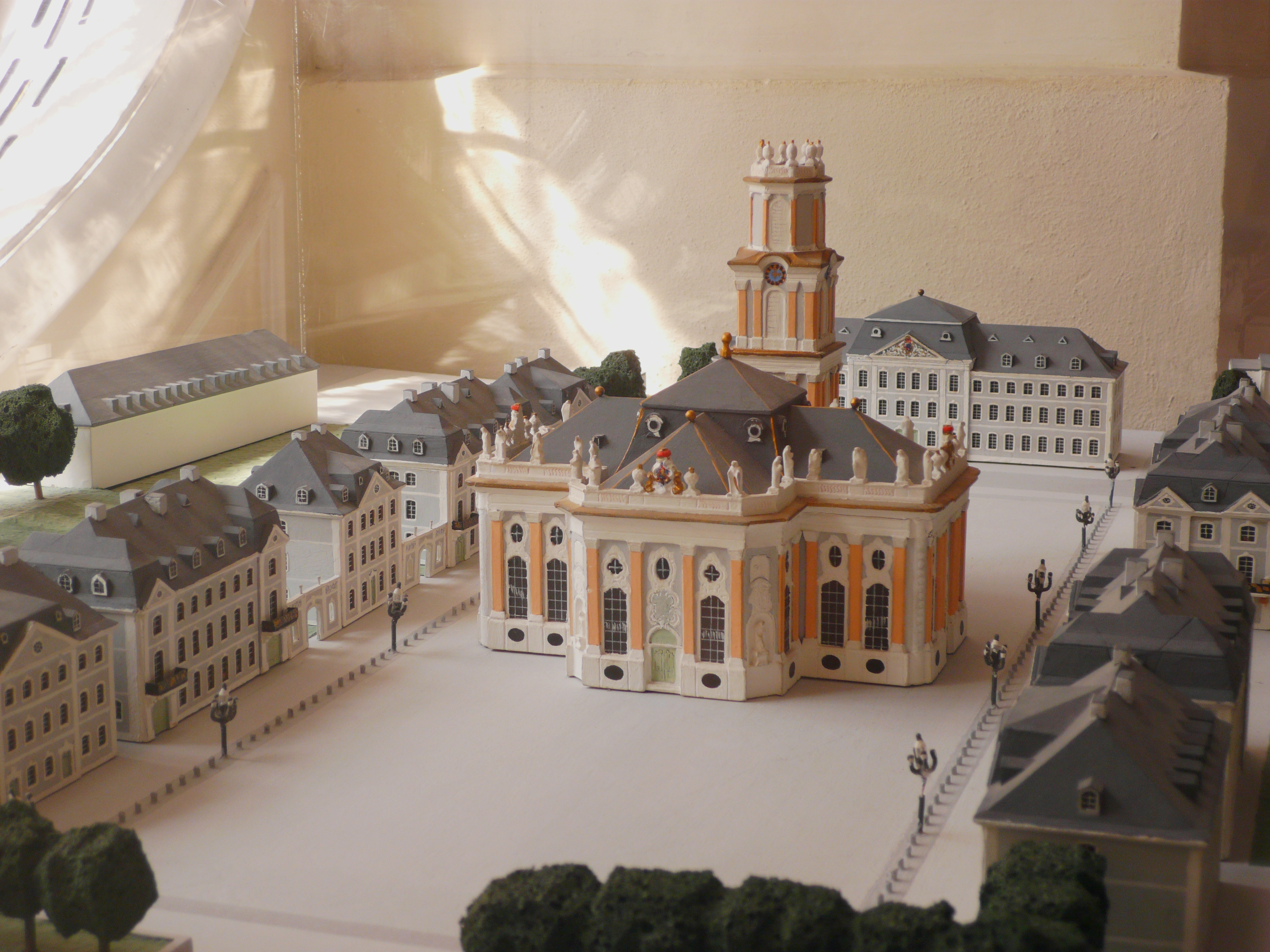
Ludwigskirche reconstructed exterior finish (model)

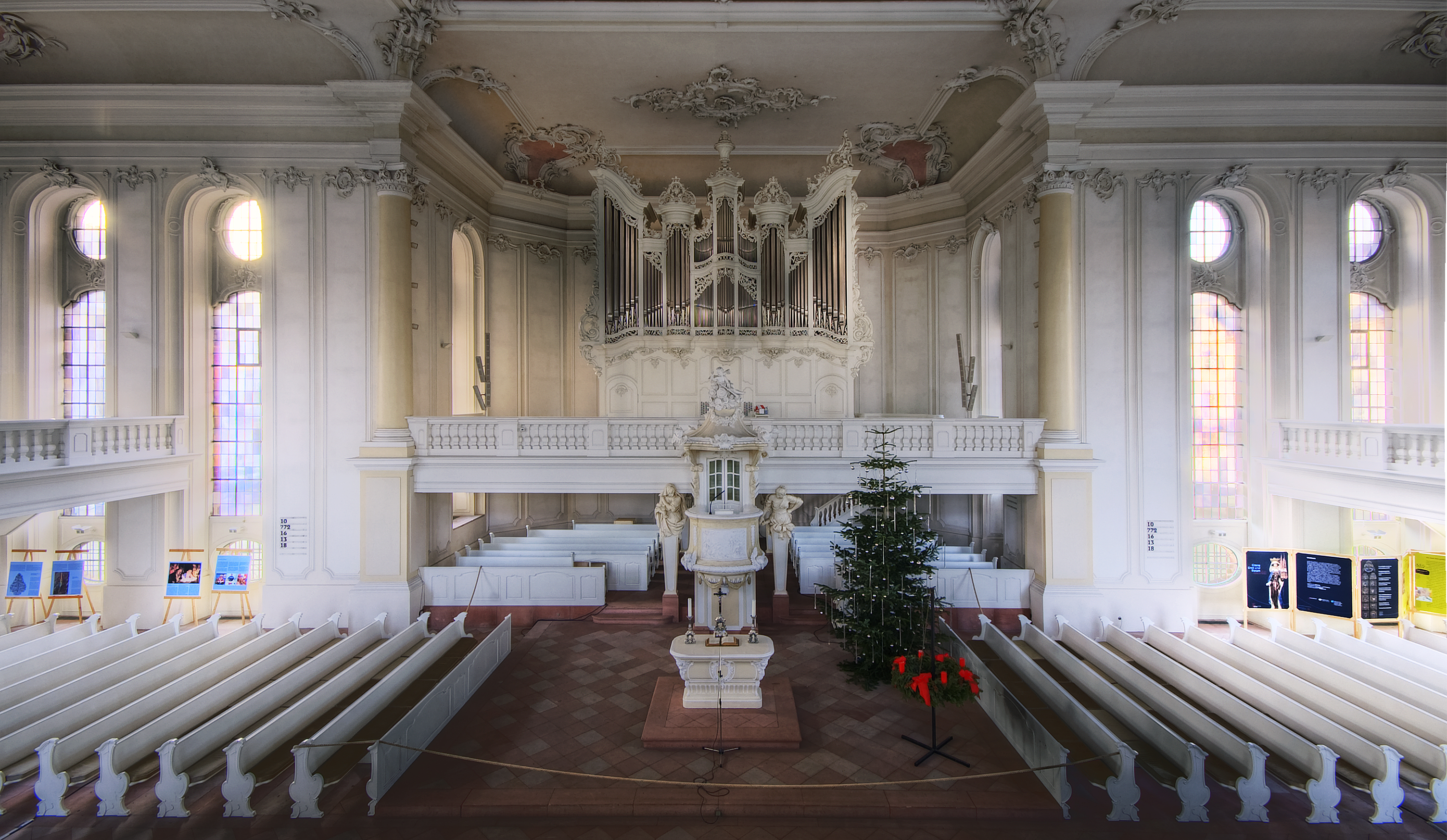
Interior

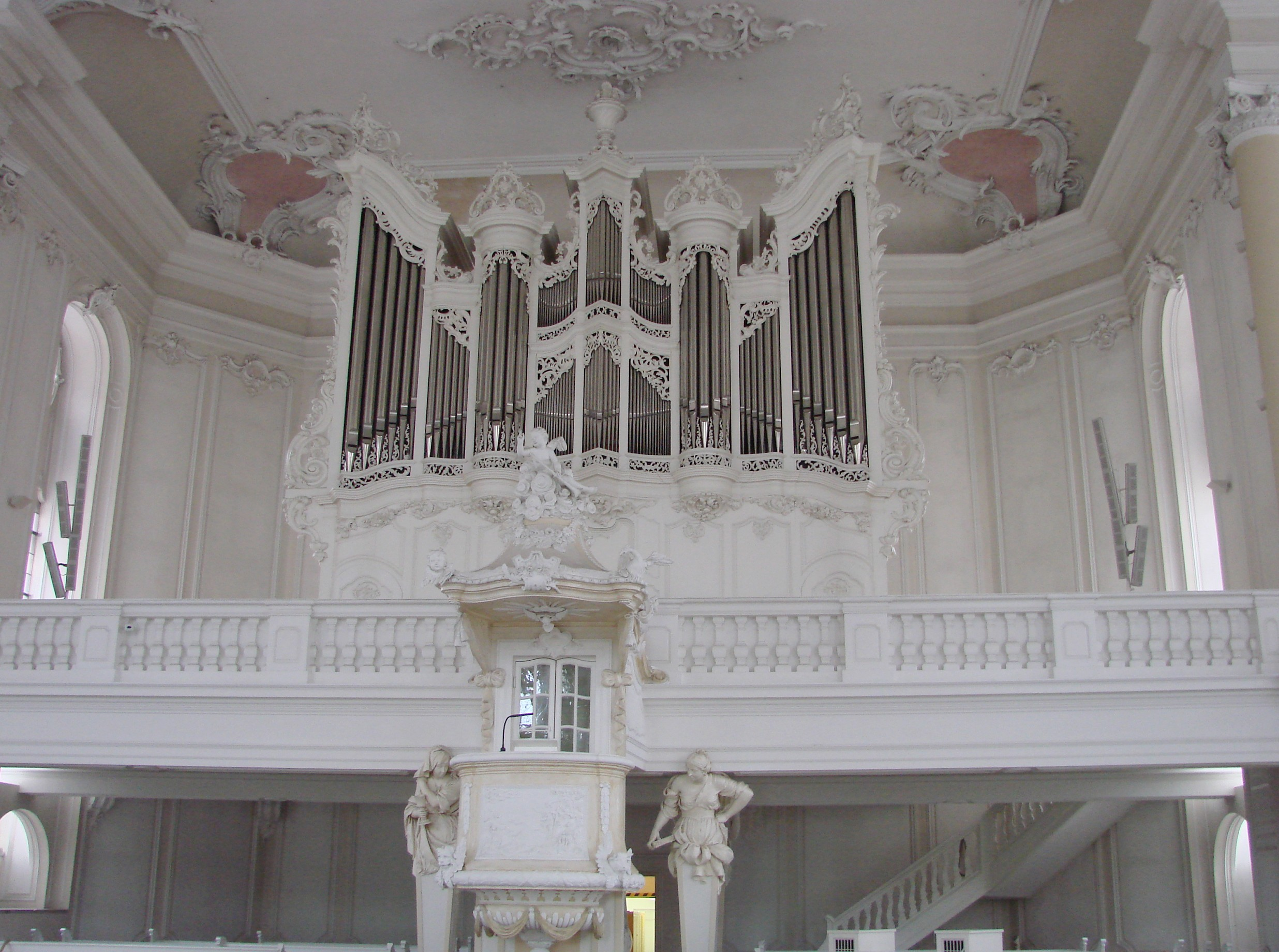
Organ gallery and pulpit

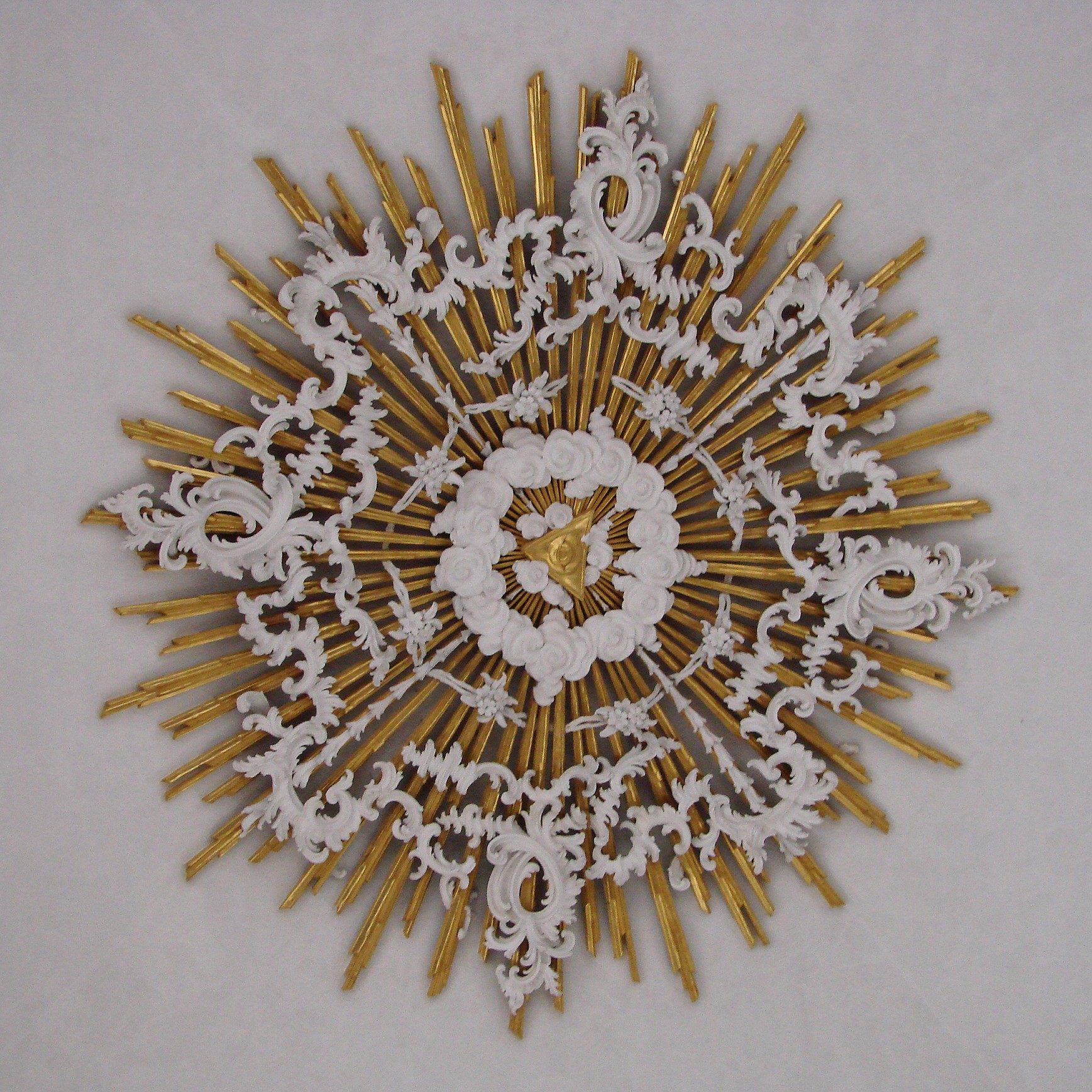
Central ceiling decoration: symbol of God in sunbeams

Ludwigskirche and the surrounding Ludwigsplatz (Ludwig's Square) were designed as a "complete work of art", in the sense of a baroque place royale, by Friedrich Joachim Stengel on the commission of Prince William Henry. Construction begun in 1762. After the death of William Henry in 1768, work on it was stopped due to lack of funds. The church was finally completed in 1775 by his son, Louis, and it was also named after him. The consecration of the church took place on August 25, 1775, with a church service and a cantata composed especially for the occasion.

In 1885-1887 and in 1906-1911, the church underwent restoration. During the Second World War, Ludwigskirche was almost completely destroyed. After a bombing on October 5, 1944, only the surrounding walls remained. Rebuilding began in 1949, but it has still not been completed. The main reason for this long delay was the fierce dispute, which lasted from the 1950s into the 1970s, about whether the baroque interior, which had been completely lost, should also be reconstructed according to the original plans. At first, it had been agreed to restore the exterior, with a modern interior, but this plan was finally abandoned. After the reconstruction of the "Fürstenstuhl" (i.e., the princely seating in the gallery across from the organ) in 2009, the interior is more or less complete, but more than half of the balustrade figures on the outside are still lacking as well as the exterior finish (cf. the reconstruction models).

== Design ==
The ground plan is shaped somewhat like a Greek cross; the arms are 38.5 m and 34.2 m long and are each 17 m wide. There are niches on the outside which contain statues of the four Evangelists by Francuß Bingh. The stone balustrades were decorated with 28 figures, also by Bingh, depicting the apostles, prophets and other Biblical people.

The interior of the church is decorated with ornamental stucco (cartouches, rocaille). Each of the four arms of the cross has a gallery supported by two to four caryatids. The floor is made of sandstone.

Special features of the interior are the arrangement of the church by and large along the width of the church, on the one hand, and the placement of the altar, pulpit and organ over each other (a so-called "pulpit-altar"), on the other. The arrangement with the altar, pulpit and organ was rather usual for a Lutheran church built in the 1700s, and it had already been used by Stengel in some of his earlier buildings.

Stengel designed not only the overall plan of the church and the surrounding palaces, from the handles for the doors to the overall grounds, but he also fitted the church and the square into the two main viewing axes of the city's layout. One of these axes, from the "Alten Kirche" (Old Church) in the city district of St. Johann, through the Wilhelm-Heinrich-Straße of today and the main entrance, up to the altar, is still visible today. The other axis points over the exit, which faces the Saarland state chancellery today, toward the former royal summer residences on Ludwigsberg, the so-called Ludwigspark.

The restoration of the original white paint on the exterior is still currently being disputed. Whether it was already lost during the 19th century or during the air raid 1945 is not clear, but it would be important for fitting the church into the surrounding buildings of the square. It has, however, become quite a strange idea to many local residents in the past decades.

== Ludwigsplatz ==
Drawing of the buildings originally planned for Ludwigsplatz

The square surrounding the church, Ludwigsplatz, was an integral part of Stengel's concept from the beginning. The original plan provided for a long, rectangular square, with four differently designed types of noble city palaces along the long sides and two large public buildings on the ends. Even during construction, this concept was changed, so that the building on the east (in which the Ludwigsgymnasium was housed) was split in two, in favor of a view toward St. Johann (the "Stengel axis", today marked by Wilhelm-Heinrich-Straße). Only the western building was kept (the orphanage at that time, today the seat of the Hochschule der Bildenden Künste Saar, Saar College of Fine Arts). The remains of the Gymnasium, which was severely damaged by the great bombing in 1944, was torn down in 1945. It stood approximately where the upper plateau of the stairs is today. In the lines of palaces planned for the long sides of the square, the four smallest buildings on the corners of the square were never erected – which made it possible to have a street running between the orphanage and the church, which detracts from the impression of the square as much as the trees currently there. In contrast to that is the place that Stengel intentionally left open for the view toward Ludwigsberg, which is today occupied by the state chancellery.

== Organ ==
Until 1944 there was an organ of the company Stumm with 37 stops. The modern organ case is a reconstruction of the historical case. The current organ was built in 1982 by Rudolf von Beckerath / Hamburg. It has 47 stops and three keyboards. The tracker action and the couplers are mechanical. The organ has the following stoplist:

I Hauptwerk C–g^{3}
1.	Bordun	16′
2.	Prinzipal	8′
3.	Spitzflöte	8′
4.	Gamba	8′
5.	Blockflöte	4′
6.	Oktave	4′
7.	Quinte	2^{2}/_{3}′
8.	Oktave	2′
9.	Mixtur VI
10.	Fagott	16′
11.	Trompete	8′

II Schwellwerk C–g^{3}
12.	Violprinzipal	8′
13.	Holzflöte	8′
14.	Gemshorn	8′
15.	Schwebung	8′
16.	Oktave	4′
17.	Traversflöte	4′
18.	Nasal	2^{2}/_{3}′
19.	Flachflöte	2′
20.	Terz	1^{3}/_{5}′
21.	Sifflöte	1′
22.	Scharfmixtur IV-VI
23.	Englischhorn	16′
24.	Hautbois	8′
25.	Clairon	4′
	Tremulant

III Oberwerk C–g^{3}
26.	Holzgedackt	8′
27.	Quintadena	8′
28.	Prinzipal	4′
29.	Rohrflöte	4′
30.	Oktave	2′
31.	Quinte	1^{1}/_{3}′
32.	Sesquialtera II	2^{2}/_{3}′
33.	Zimbel III
34.	Rankett	16′
35.	Cromorne	8′
	Tremulant

Pedal C–f^{1}
36.	Subbaß	16′
37.	Prinzipal	16′
38.	Quinte	10^{2}/_{3}′
39.	Oktave	8′
40.	Gemshorn	8′
41.	Oktave	4′
42.	Nachthorn	2′
43.	Rauschpeife III
44.	Mixtur VI
45.	Posaune	16′
46.	Trompete	8′
47.	Trompete	4′

- Couplers: II/I, III/I, III/II, I/P, II/P, III/P
- Plenum, Tutti, 10-fache Setzeranlage

== Other ==
In 1965, Ludwigskirche was depicted on the series of stamps, Hauptstädte der Länder der Bundesrepublik Deutschland (Capital cities of the states of the Federal Republic of Germany).

As the symbol of the Saarland state capital of Saarbrücken, Ludwigskirche is shown on the German 2 euro commemorative coin in 2009.

Foreign language guidebooks often describe Ludwigskirche as "église St. Louis" or "St. Louis church". However, it is not (in contrast to the Catholic church, St. Ludwig in Saarlouis) dedicated to Saint Louis, but named after Louis, Prince of Nassau-Saarbrücken, who completed its construction. The Lutheran congregation of Ludwigskirche forms part of the Evangelical Church in the Rhineland, comprising Lutheran, Reformed and United Protestant congregations.

== Literature ==
- Georg Dehio: Handbuch der deutschen Kunstdenkmäler. Rheinland-Pfalz, Saarland. Deutscher Kunstverlag. Munich 1984. pp. 889–892. ISBN 3-422-00382-7. in German
- Dieter Heinz: Ludwigskirche zu Saarbrücken. 2nd edition. Saarbrücken 1979. ISBN 3-477-00061-7 in German
- Horst Heydt: Ludwigskirche und Ludwigsplatz zu Alt-Saarbrücken. Saarbrücken 1991, ISBN 3-9802837-0-4. in German
- Horst Heydt (Hrsg.): Die Ludwigskirche zu Saarbrücken. Merziger Druckerei & Verlag, Merzig 2008, 229 S. in German

== See also ==
- Saarbrücken Castle
- Basilica of St. John the Baptist, Saarbrücken
