= Museu Histórico de Ipê =

Coordinates: 28°49′13″S 51°16′50″W

- Museu Histórico de Ipê
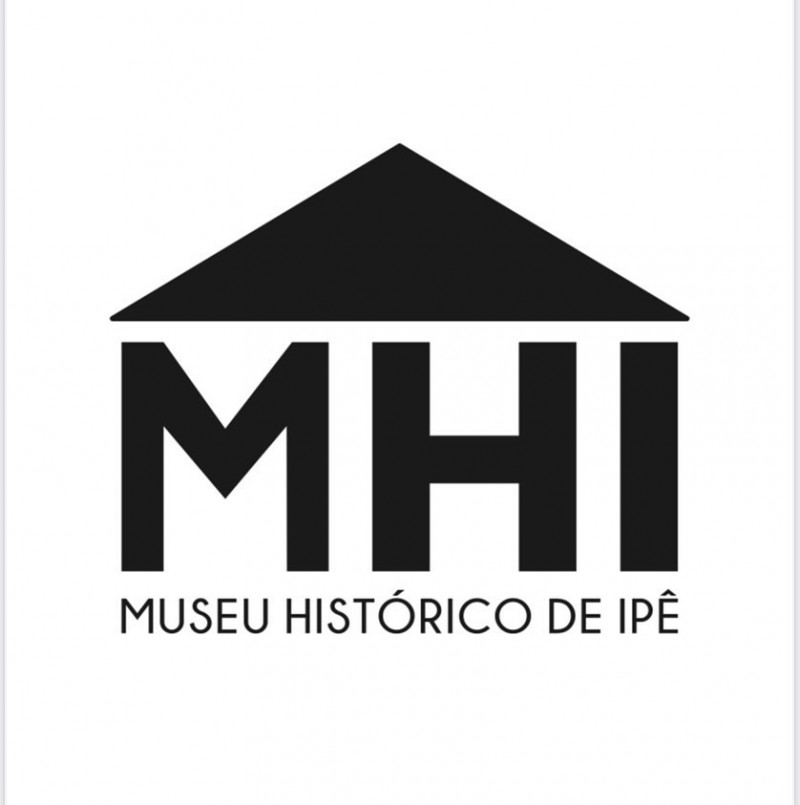
- Established: December 20, 2012
- Location: Ipê, Rio Grande do Sul, Brazil
- Type: Story Museum
- Director: Cristiane dos Anjos Parisoto
- Historian: Orestes Jayme Mega
- Owner: Government of the City of Ipê
- Employees: 3
- Website: https://www.pmipe.rs.gov.br/

The Historical Museum of Ipê, also known by the acronym MHI, is a Brazilian museum located in Ipê, Rio Grande do Sul. It houses various ancient relics, as well as the history of the region, including artifacts from the native peoples who once inhabited the area.

MHI aims to keep the events and discoveries of the area alive, thereby passing on knowledge to future generations. Established in 2012, it has undergone several changes over the years, resulting in wear and tear on the pieces in the collection. Now, the museum has finally found a permanent and secure space in the old Seminary building, which now belongs to the municipality. The Municipal Department of Education and Culture oversaw the necessary renovations, with the support of the Municipal Department of Public Works and students from the Museum Preservation Unit, supervised by Professor Cristiane dos Anjos Parisoto. The museum also houses the Mario Quintana Library and the Artisans' Room.

In September 2023, the MHI (Historical Museum of Ipê) held its first 'Primavera dos Museus' (Museums' Spring), featuring an art exhibition by art teacher Karina Hilgert Kaspary, a native of São Paulo das Missões who is established in Ipê. The exhibition, titled 'As Linhas do Sentir' (The Lines of Feeling), presented a series of paintings that explore the union of flowers, portraits, and affective bonds in a style she named Florilhismo.

== Gallery ==
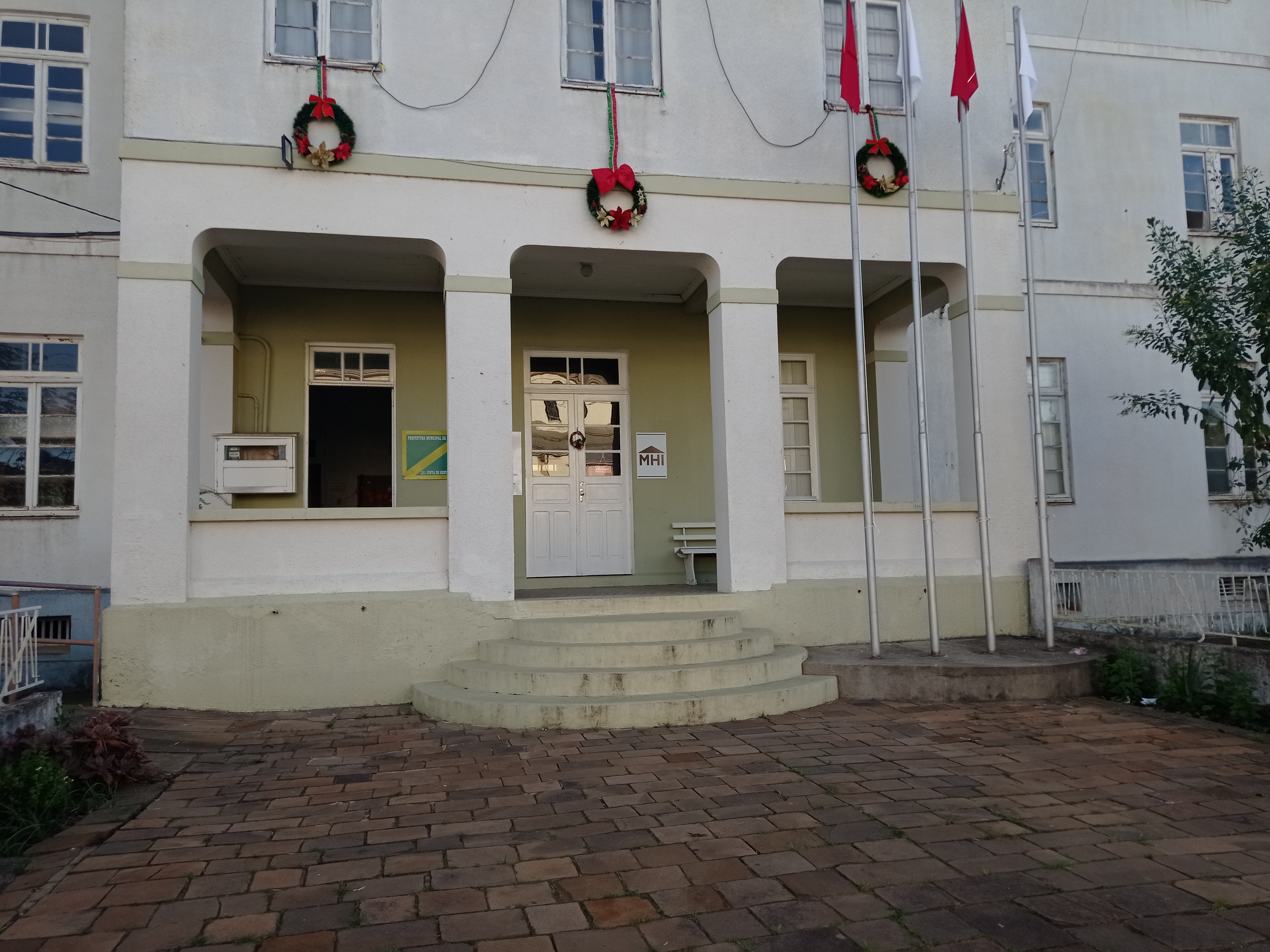
The image depicts the Ipê Historical Museum, capturing the facade and surroundings of the building.
