= Princess Sophie of Erbach-Erbach =

Princess of Nassau-Saarbrücken (1725–1795)

Sophie of Erbach-Erbach
- Princess of Nassau-Saarbrücken
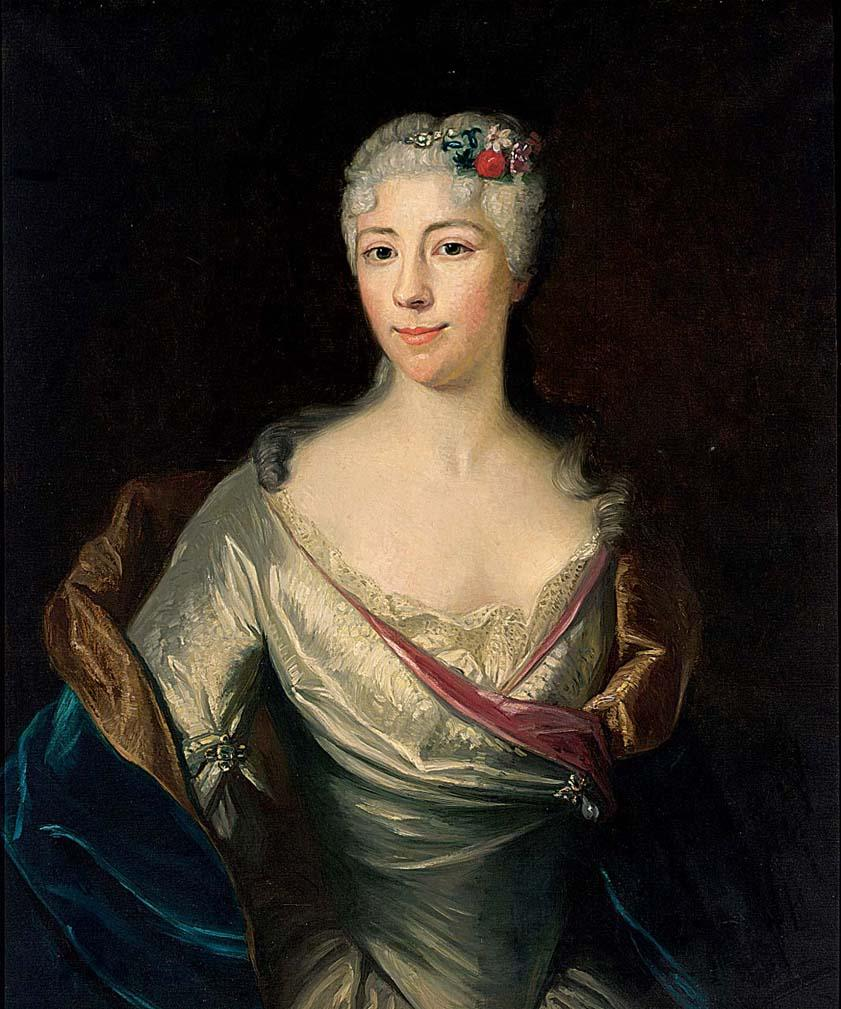
- Born: 12 June 1725; Schloss Reichenberg
- Died: 10 July 1795 (aged 70); Aschaffenburg
- Noble family: Erbach
- Spouse: William Henry, Prince of Nassau-Saarbrücken
- Issue: Louis, Prince of Nassau-Saarbrücken; Princess Anne Caroline; Princess Wilhelmine Henriette
- Father: Georg Wilhelm, Count of Erbach-Erbach
- Mother: Countess Sophie Charlotte of Bothmer

Princess Sophie Christine of Erbach-Erbach (German: Sophie Christine Charlotte Friederike Erdmuthe Gräfin zu Erbach-Erbach) was the wife of William Henry, Prince of Nassau-Saarbrücken and was the mother of Louis, Prince of Nassau-Saarbrücken.

== Life ==
=== Origin and family ===
Countess Sophie Erdmuthe zu Erbach-Erbach was born as the daughter of Count Georg Wilhelm of Erbach-Erbach (1686–1757) and his wife, Countess Sophie Charlotte von Bothmer (1697–1748), a daughter of Count Johann Caspar von Bothmer of Lauenbrück.

In January 1742, on the occasion of the election of the emperor Charles VII in Frankfurt, she met William Henry II of Nassau-Saarbrücken (* 6 March 1718; † 24 July 1768). The marriage contract was signed in Frankfurt on February 15, 1742, and the church wedding took place in Erbach on February 28, 1742. The marriage produced children

- Sophie Auguste (1743–1747)
- Louis (1745–1794), Prince of Nassau-Saarbrücken, married Princess Wilhelmina of Schwarzburg-Rudolstadt
- Friedrich August (1748–1750)
- Anna Karoline (1751–1824)

⚭ 1769 Duke Friedrich Heinrich of Schleswig-Holstein-Sonderburg-Glücksburg
⚭ 1782 Duke Friedrich Karl of Braunschweig-Bevern

- Wilhelmine Henriette (1752–1829)

⚭ 1783 Louis Armand de Seiglières, Marquis de Soyécourt-Feuquières (1722–1790)

=== Work ===
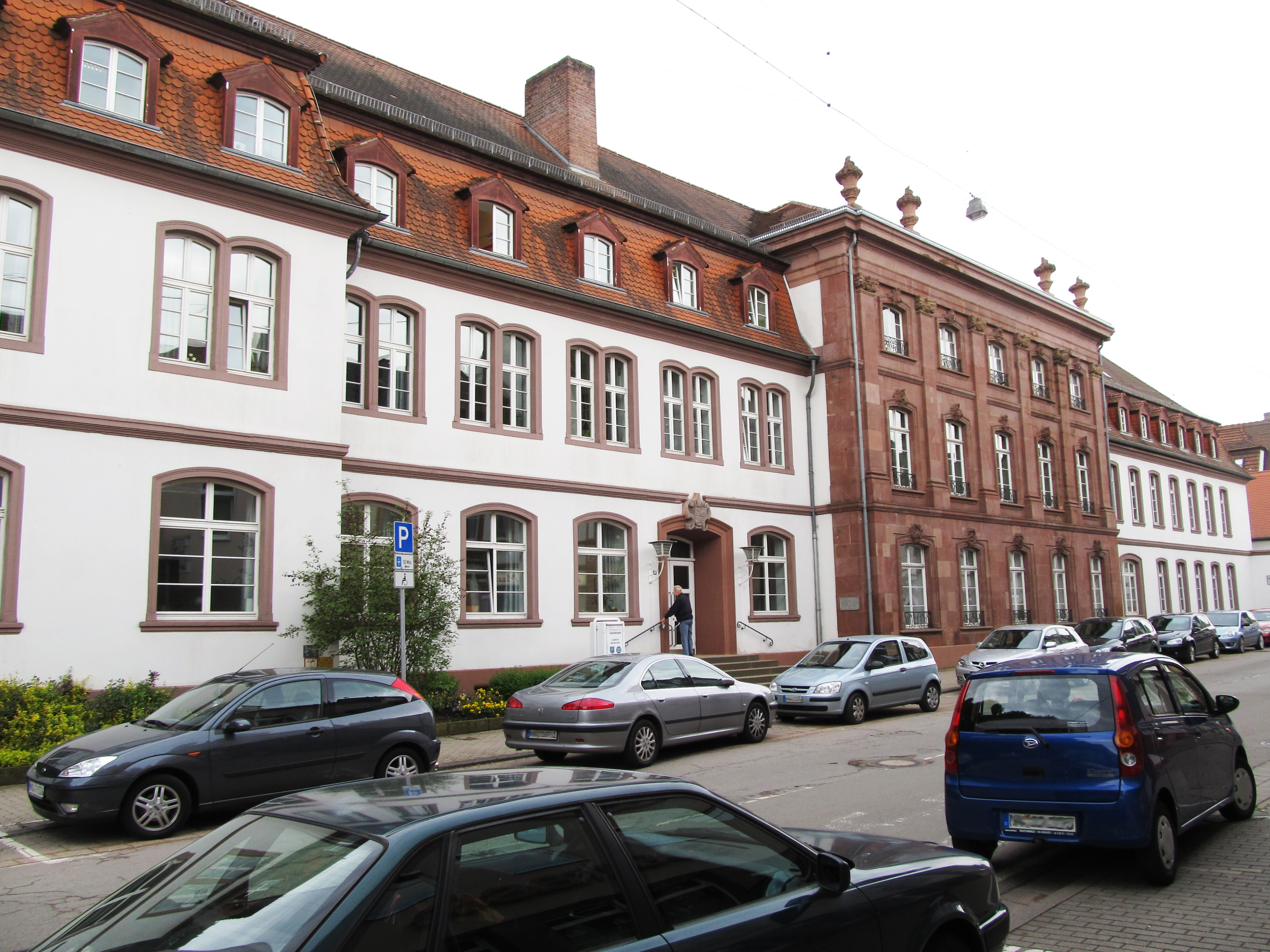
Temporary widow's residence in Ottweiler

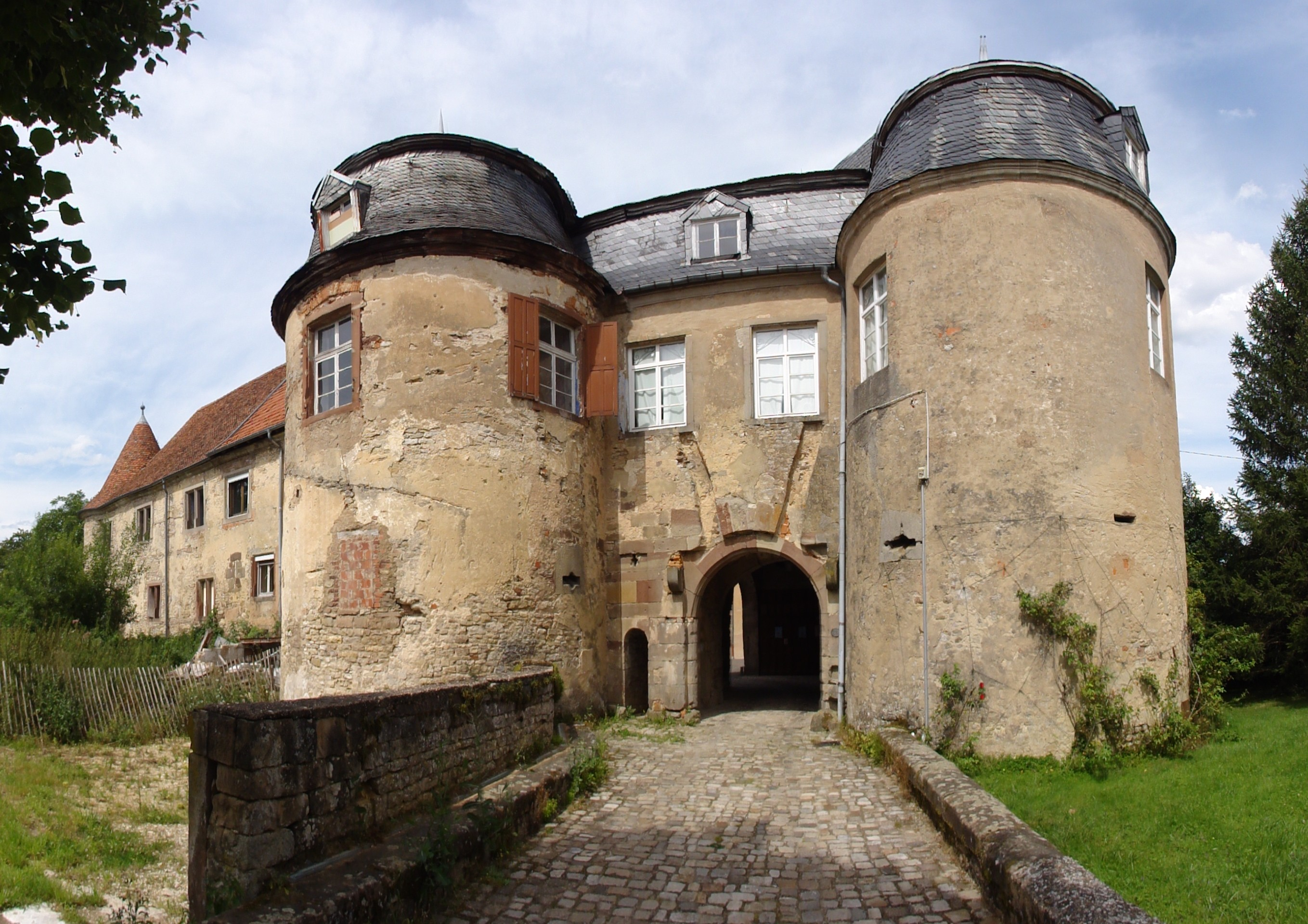
Schloss Lorenzen, widow's residence

Sophie Erdmuthe was mostly responsible for raising her children alone, as her husband was often away as a French officer. She was extremely musically gifted and received an education in music, languages and literature in Erbach. Her friend, the Margravine Karoline Luise of Hesse-Darmstadt (1723–1783), gave her access to the highest circles in Paris.

In 1757 she came into contact with the Parisian writer and theater and music critic Friedrich Melchior Baron von Grimm. Thanks to his connections, she was in lively exchange of ideas with philosophers and writers such as Voltaire and Diderot. Diderot's comedy Le Père de famille contains the dedication "TO HER HOLY HIGHNESS THE PRINCESS OF NASSAU-SARREBRUCK".

In 1750 she wrote the songbook Zarte Liebe fesselt mich, which was republished in 2001 - musically and music-historically revised by Wendelin Müller-Blattau and provided with adaptations by Ludwig Harig.

After the death of her husband, she was the guardian of her children and regent of Nassau-Saarbrücken and moved to Ottweiler Castle in 1770 and then later to Lorentzen Castle.

In 1779 she converted to the Catholic faith in the Abbey of Conflans, where the Archbishop of Paris was present.

In 1793 the princess fled from the approaching French revolutionary troops, first to Trarbach on the Moselle, then to Neuwied and finally to Aschaffenburg, where she died on September 7, 1795, aged 70.
