= Igreja Matriz São Luiz Rei =

Catholic church in Brazil

São Luiz Rei
- Church Matriz São Luiz Rei
- Igreja Matriz São Luiz Rei
- São Luiz Rei
- 28°49′12″S 51°16′48″W
- Location: Ipê, Rio Grande do Sul, Brazil
- Language: Portuguese

Architecture
- Years built: 1840-1880

Clergy
- Vicar: Fa. Frei Nédio Pértile Fa. Frei Raimundo Costella

The Igreja Matriz São Luiz Rei is a Catholic church located in Ipê, Brazil.

== History ==
In 1835, led by Emílio Subtil de Camargo, residents of Ipê (then called Formigueiro) went to Porto Alegre to seek the creation of a parish with Archbishop D. João Becker. The church was built between 1840 and 1880, on a piece of land donated by the widow of Luiz Augusto de Medeiros Branco. She imposed the condition that the patron saint of the church would be Saint Louis, King of France, in honor of her late husband and because Saint Louis was the family's patron saint. The initial version was constructed using pine wood, a prevalent tree in the region.

On March 10, 1936, the Archbishop recognized the church as the Parish of São Luiz de França, attached to the Prelature of Vacaria. On April 5, 1936, the first Vicar, Father Frei Eduardo Totti, took office.

It is one of the first buildings in the city of Ipê, built by Italian immigrants who settled there. With the great Catholic influence in the region, it gave rise to one of the first names of the municipality of Ipê.

The church has 23 more paintings on the walls and windows, statues of saints carved in wood and stone, as well as mosaics of Catholic images.

== Cardinal Protector ==
Cardinal Protector for years
n	Name	Years
1	Friar Eduardo Totti	1936–1964
2	Friar Casimiro Ernesto Zaffonato	1964–1987
3	–	–
4	–	–
5	Friar Daniel Costella	–2019
6	Friar Clair José Zampieron	2019–
