= Basilica of St. John the Baptist, Saarbrücken =

Coordinates: 49°13′59″N 6°59′54″E

Basilica of St. John the Baptist
- Basilika St. Johannes der Täufer
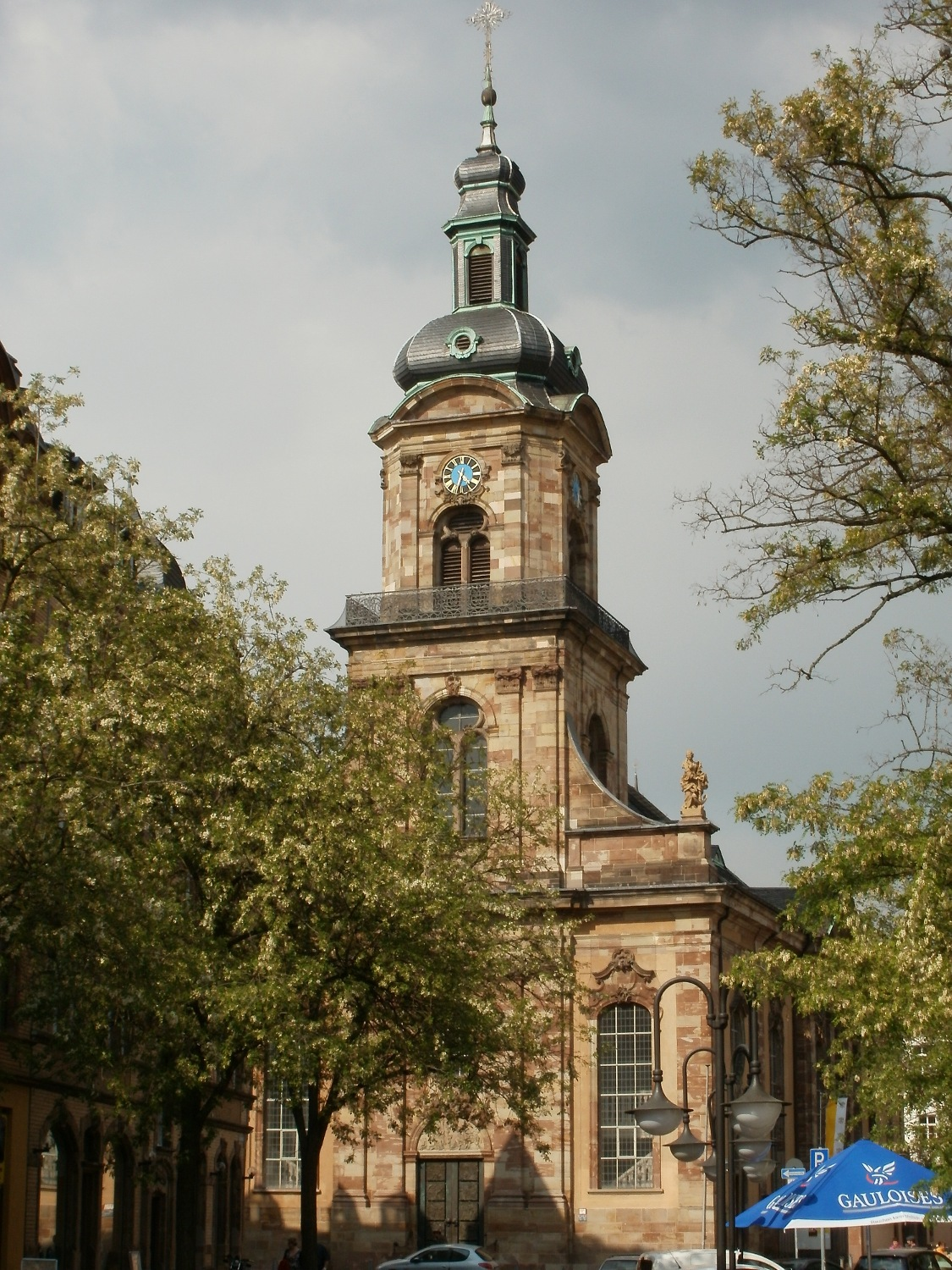
- Basilica of St. John the Baptist
- Location: Saarbrücken
- Country: Germany
- Denomination: Roman Catholic Church

The Basilica of St. John the Baptist (German: Basilika St. Johannes der Täufer ), also called Saarbrücken Basilica, is a catholic basilica located in the market of St. John (St. Johannes) in Saarbrücken in Germany.

The temple of St. John was administered at the time of the Reformation by a noble Protestant and only one chapel, the chapel of St. John, was assigned to those who remained faithful to the Catholic faith. In the eighteenth century, under the French government of Louis XIV, the Catholic population grew. Next, they financed the construction of a Basilica, which was the only religious building built on the site for a hundred years. The Basilica of St. John was built on the site of the chapel of the same name by the architect Friedrich Joachim Stengel between 1754 and 1758.

The Basilica was remodeled, destroyed and restored several times. The interior has been redesigned according to the original baroque between 1972 and 1975. The Basilica obtained its present name by a decision of Pope Paul VI, who made it a Basilica. The Basilica is part of a parish with five churches .

In addition to Catholic masses, organ concerts are regularly held.

== See also ==
- Roman Catholicism in Germany
- Basilica of St. John the Baptist

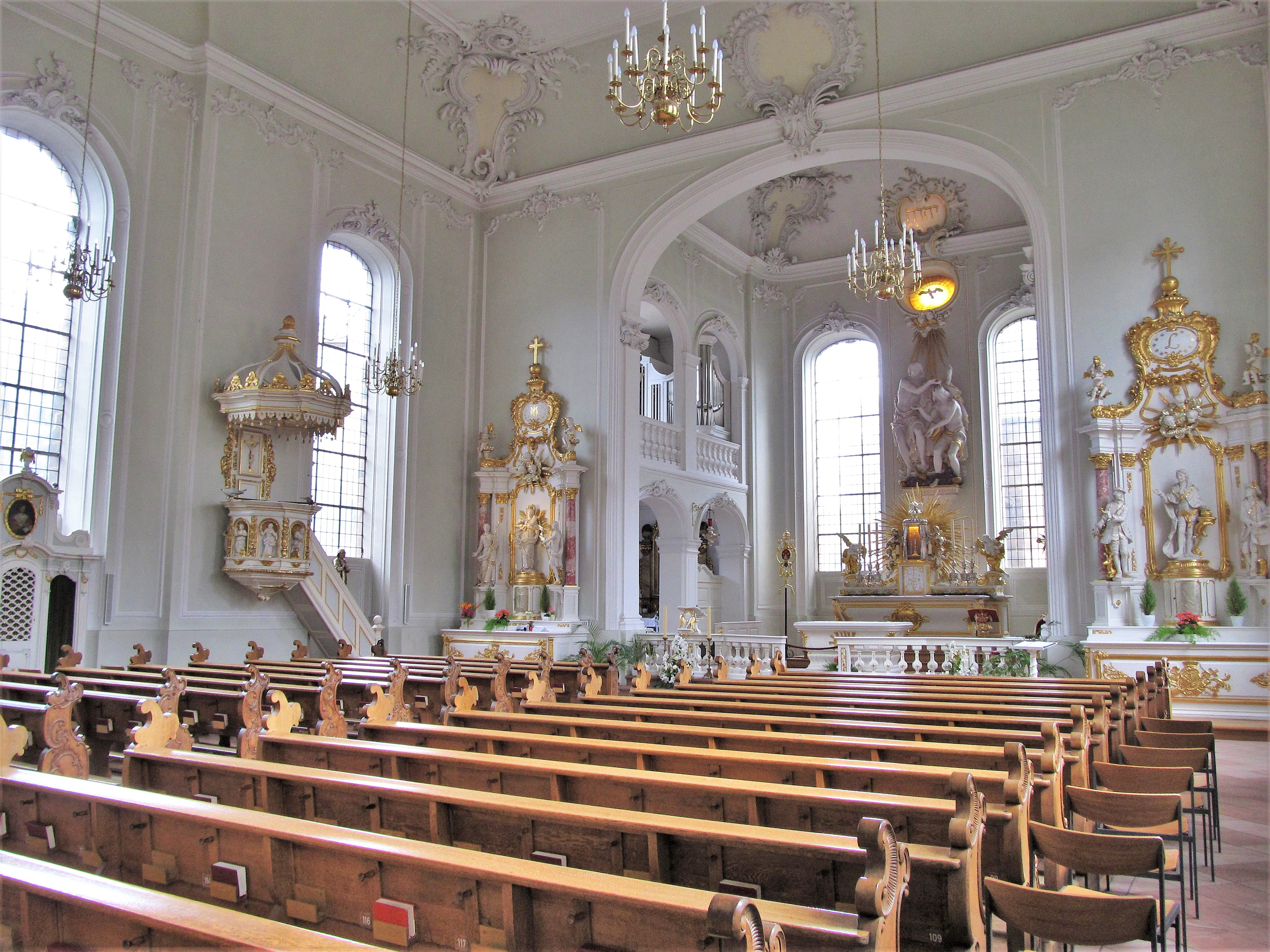
Internal view
