= St. Louis Church (Caledonia, Wisconsin) =

Roman Catholic church in the United States

Coordinates: 42°48′26.5″N 87°56′48.1″W

St. Louis Parish is a Roman Catholic Church in Caledonia, Racine County, Wisconsin. It is within the Archdiocese of Milwaukee. There is also a cemetery where about 1,070 people are buried. The modern structure was built in the Romanesque revival style in the early 20th century. The actual church was founded in 1843 by Rev. Martin Kundig as a mostly German-immigrant congregation. He built a log structure in 1844–1845. A decade later, a frame church was built, but was later destroyed by fire in 1930. The present-day stone church was constructed "A.D. 1903", as indicated from an inscription on the corner of the building.
