= Saarbrücken Castle =

- Schloss Saarbrücken
- Saarbrücken
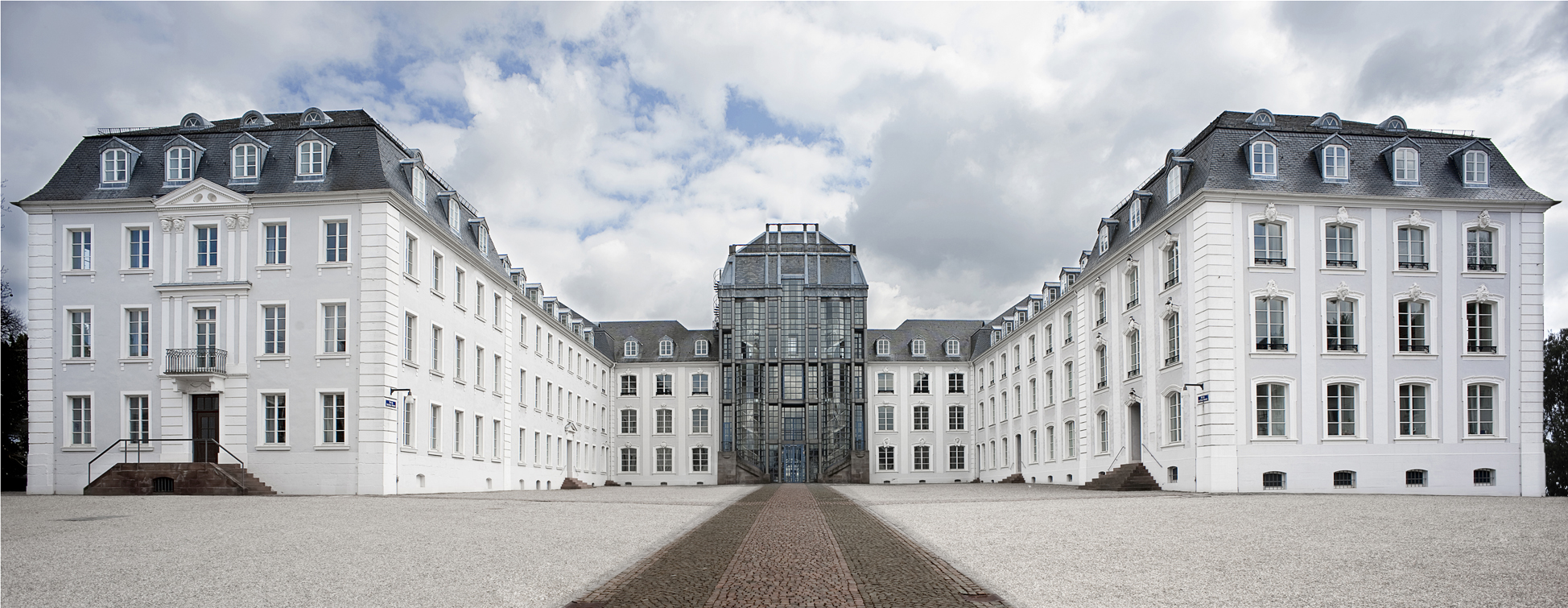
- Saarbrücken Castle

Site information
- Type: Palace
- Open to the public: Partially
- Condition: In use

Location
- Shown within Saarland, Germany Saarbrücken Castle (Germany)
- Coordinates: 49°13′48″N 6°59′33″E

Site history
- Built: 1575

Saarbrücken Castle (German: Schloss Saarbrücken) is a Baroque château in Saarbrücken, the capital of Saarland. It is located in the district of Alt-Saarbrücken on the left bank of the Saar. Earlier, a medieval castle and a Renaissance castle stood on the same site.

== History ==
=== Middle ages ===
Historical sources from the year 999, reported the existence of an imperial Castell Sarabruca. In 1009, it is named as Veste Sarebrugka. A document from 1065 mentions that Duke Frederick of Lower Lorraine received the castle as a fief from the King. Later, Emperor Henry IV gave the castle to Frederick's brother, Count Adalbero III of Luxembourg, who was Bishop of Metz.

In 1168, the castle was destroyed by Count Symon, on the orders of Emperor Frederick I. Later archives mention a Castel and Bourg on 2 July 1277.

A deed from 1485 reports that Count John II .... in 1459, because of the war, began to fortify and guard the two cities. In 1463, John added a bulwark and a drawbridge across the moat that separated the castle from the city.

=== 16th century ===
Johann Andreae, the chronicler of the Counts of Nassau-Saarbrücken, reports that Count Philip IV built a summer residence in Saarbrücken and provides a sketch of appearance of the medieval castle. It had a trapezoid-shaped inner court, surrounded by buildings of different widths. There was a tower on the western side. The bailey on the Saar side was enclosed on the northwest and southeast by buildings. The summer house had been designed by architect Christmann Stromeyer from the Electorate of the Palatinate and stood on the southeastern edge of the cliff . The castle was surrounded in the north-east by the Saar Rocks and the river Saar, on the east by a ditch and on the south and southwest by the bulwark and a moat. The entrance was the drawbridge opposite the large tower. At the southern end of the garden was a red tower and at the northern corner a small round tower.

=== 17th century ===
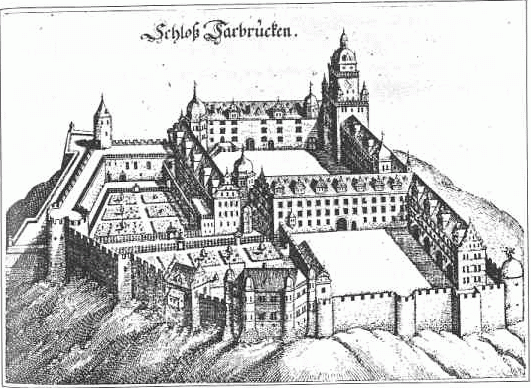
View of the castle by Merian

Drawings by Hienrich Höers provide a reliable and authentic image of the topography of the palace complex in the 17th century. It shows a four-winged structure inside a curtain wall with differently shaped bastions. Defensive structures including towers, walls, gatehouses and trenches followed the topography of the Saar rock. The rampart was strengthened with triangular corner bastions. In October 1983, excavations next to the road in the valley, performed while preparing the foundations of a technical annex, unearthed a part of these extensive fortifications in several different layers. A bastion and parts of the southwestern rampart were included in the design of the new annex, and can be visited today.

The trapezoidal main courtyard was surrounded by four wings. Three of these were joined at right angles. The main square was surrounded by buildings of equal width. The three-storey building could be accessed from spiral staircases in the stair towers at the corners of the inner courtyard. The framework was completed at the south side by four superimposed arcades. The forecourt on the Saar side was bounded on the northwest by the Botzheim building, named after the chief forester who resided there in 1728. To the northeast, it was bounded by a small single-storey cross-wing, and to then north by the castle wall. In front of the summer house on the southeastern rock was a garden house.

=== Transition to the 18th century ===
The castle was destroyed by imperial troops on 16 May 1677. It was restored around 1696 by architect Josef C. Motte, nicknamed la Bonté, on the orders of Countess Eleonore Clara of Hohenlohe-Gleichen, the widow of Count Gustav Adolph and her son Louis Crato. The wing adjacent to the road to St. Arnual Rauschen Thal (today's Talstraße) was, according to reconstruction plans that have been preserved, carried out à la mode. The courtyard was opened to the garden on the south side and bordered by a single-storey arcade hallway. The garden was extended beyond the castle wall and far into the valley as a terraced French formal garden. A sepia drawing, made after 1710, probably by Anton Kohl, shows the castle and the market square. It shows the ground plan of the restored castle. A low arcade tract replaces the earlier east wing. The west wing was a Bergfried, which had been built during the reign of the Hohenstaufens.

During sewer repairs in August 1977, a three-metre thick wall was discovered that had been part of the main tower of the Renaissance castle. In March 1989, during the redevelopment of the Palace Square, the staircase was removed and the foundations of the tower were fully excavated. This rectangular, five-storey clock tower — the fifth storey had been added in 1613 — towered over the castle's four wings and was topped with a dome with dormer windows and a roof lantern. The octagonal stair towers at the four corners of the courtyard were also covered with domes.

=== 18th century ===
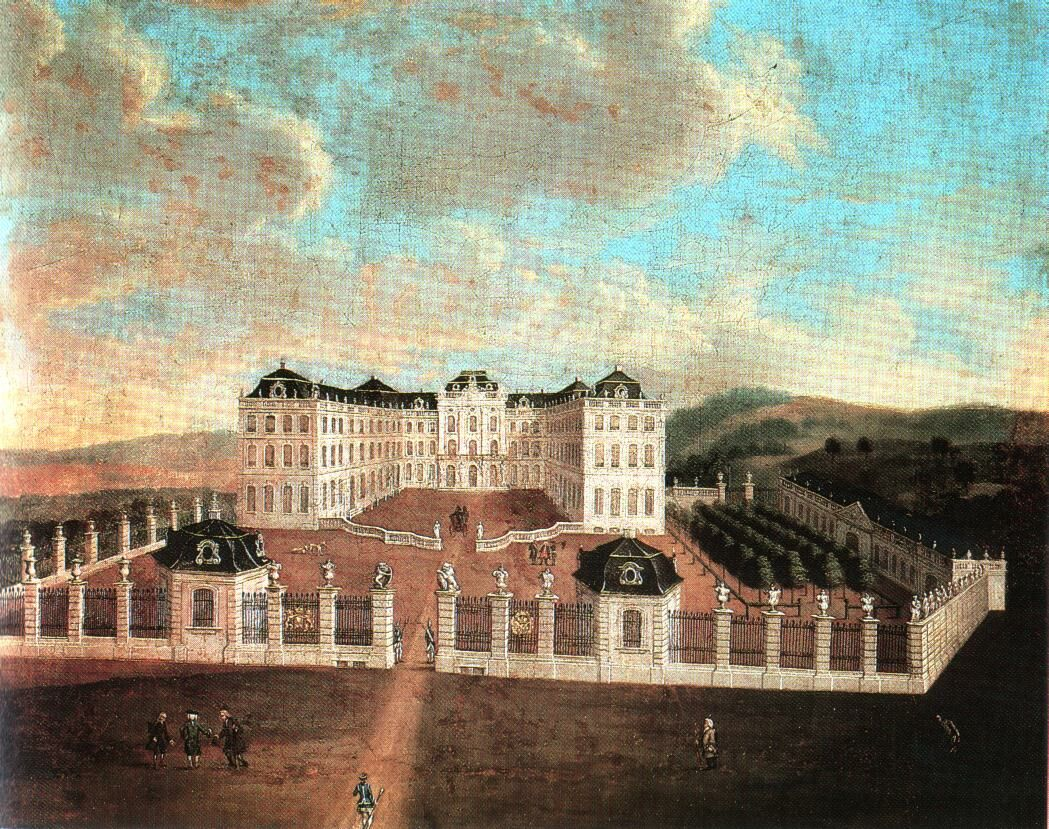
Painting of the castle after the completion of the new buildings under Friedrich Joachim Stengel

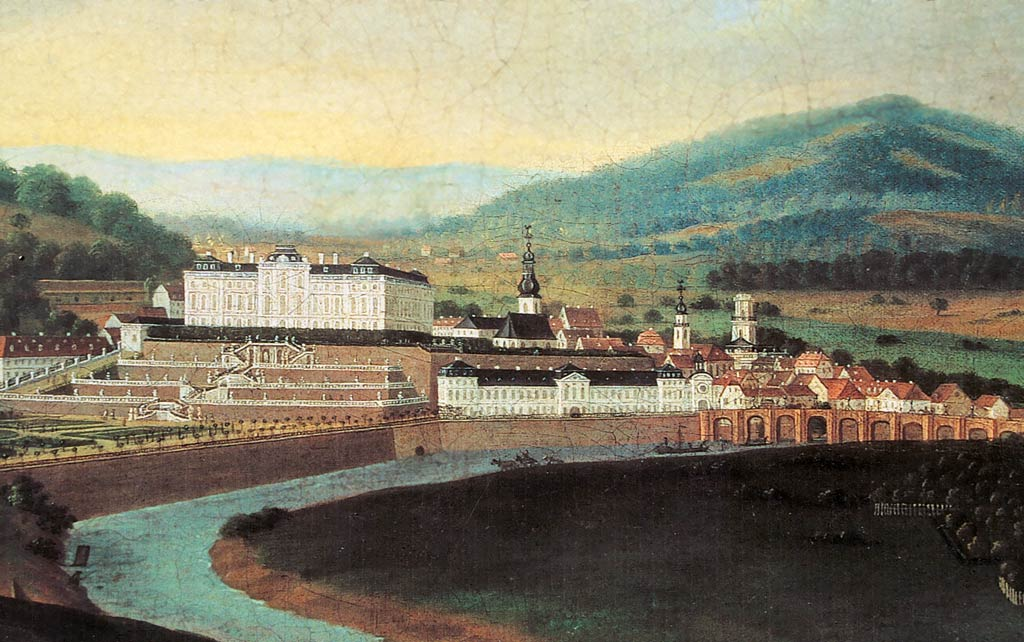
View of the castle and town of Saarbrücken in 1770

After Frederick Louis of Nassau-Saarbrücken died without issue in 1728, Nassau-Saarbrücken fell back to the Nassau-Usingen branch of the House of Nassau. In 1735, Princess Charlotte Amalie, née Countess of Nassau-Dillenburg, the widow of Prince William Henry divided the possessions of the Walram line of Nassau among her sons. Charles, the elder son, was given the territories on the right bank of the Rhine; his younger brother William Henry received the territories on the left bank. When William Henry came of age in 1741, he commissioned the architect Friedrich Joachim Stengel from Zerbst to write a report on the structural condition of the Saarbrücken Castle. Stengel had studied architecture at the Royal Academy of Arts in Berlin from 1708 to 1712, and had been appointed court architect in Usingen in 1733. On 26 January 1739, he proposed a design for the reconstruction of the castle. The new design did away with any defensive functions and reflected recent changes in the accepted princely lifestyle and provided a more open attitude, free access to outer courtyards and garden and a more comfortable, more splendid and refined interior. He expanded this to a comprehensive plan for central Saarbrücken, with individual buildings and groups of buildings, including a spacious square in front of the castle, a city hall, a palace for the hereditary prince Louis and the Ludwigsplatz ("Louis square"), a square connecting the Protestant Ludwigskirche ("Louis Church"), the Peace Church, and yet another palace. The city plan followed the principles of geometry and symmetry from a references axis (point de vue). The new princely palace was planned on the site of the old castle on the Saar, with residential and administrative buildings dominating the cityscape. Space for the new palace was created by slighting the old castle walls, filling in the moat and diverting the river Saar. The staggered terraces on the slope towards the Saar were expanded to create space for the new, larger Baroque garden. The new palace, a three-wing structure open to the city, with residential, representative and administrative functions, was completed in 1748. Many architects, engineers and construction workers had been hired for this project.

The palace complex was based on a square floor plan. The corps de logis dominated the complex by its roof, which towered above the other buildings. Two equally long wings were attached to the corps de logis and the central pavillon, surrounding the cour d'honneur and thereby creating an additional living space. The four corners of this horseshoe shape were emphasized with pavilions reminiscent of the defensive towers of the earlier castle. The main courtyard and the central pavilion sat on the axis of symmetry of the complex. In the earlier castle, the main courtyard had been separated from the city by a mighty donjon. In the 18th-century castle, however, the fourth side of the square was open to the city. A balustrade with busts delineated this side of the courtyard and provided an entrance on the axis of symmetry. On the other side of the main building, the axis of symmetry formed the axis of symmetrical garden, with symmetrical stairs descending to the valley. The forecourt was separated from the city by a wrought-iron fence with two octagonal guard houses. The entrance to the forecourt was through a gate that stood on the same axis as the main entrance of the corps de logis.

The basic plan of the three wings was a rectangle of 65.45 × 61.34 metres. The Corps de Logis had a length of 65.45 metres with 15 window bays: three in the central pavilion and three in each of the reserves and the corner pavilions. It was 18.26 metres deep and in this direction, it was divided by four windows.

The length of the wings was 43.08 metres. Each had ten axes: seven in the reserves and three in the pavilions at the end. In accordance with 18th-century customs, the wings were named from the point of view of the corps de logis: the wing nearest the Saar was called the right wing; the wing next to the Talstraße was called the left wing. The four pavilions were named after their compass points: northwest, southwest, northeast and southeast pavilion. The northwest and southwest pavilion each had three windows on their 14.98 metre long sides, and four windows on the 15.84 metre long sides. This geometric arrangement was supported by the symmetrical arrangement of the two main stairwells on the inner walls of the reserves in the corps de logis. The wings could also be accessed from two auxiliary staircases on the inner wall between the reserves in the wings and the northwest and southwest pavilions.

Access to the interior of the castle was from the courtyard through three main portals on the central pavilion. Another four entrances were located in the first window axis of the reserves of the wings. The corps de logis were accessed via two representative main stairs on the left and right of the central courtyard pavilion. These were in the reserves and were designed symmetrically. From the courtyard one entered the Grand Vestibule via a three-level stairs. Between the stairs and the garden was the Sala terrena. A ceremonial path led from the portal across the courtyard to the Corps de Logis. From the entrance hall, the main staircase (French: Escalier d'Honneur) led to the audience chambers of the princely family in the piano nobile, and from there to the mezzanine to the sumptuously furnished Grand Salon. The suite of the prince was in the piano nobile of the right wing of the palace, the princess's suite was of the left.

The civil administration and government archives were housed in the Rez-de-Chaussee of the right wing; the left wing housed the administration of the regiment William Henry maintained on behalf of the King of France. The storage rooms were in the basement and could be accessed from the courtyard via a door in front of the stables and a side staircase.

The palace remained the cultural and administrative centre of the principality for almost 50 years.

=== 19th century ===
After the baroque palace was partially destroyed by fire in 1793 in the turmoil of the French Revolution. In 1810, the palace was reconstructed to house eight middle-class families. Architect Johann Adam Knipper rebuilt the heavily damaged north wing on top of the preserved baroque vaults. He demolished the central pavilion in the Corps de Logis and the mezzanine floor. A lithograph of 1812 shows the free passage where the central pavilion had been. The ground and first floors of the castle were divided into three floors and equipped with a new roof. In 1872, the owner of the adjacent part of the castle, the iron works magnate Karl Ferdinand Stumm, commissioned architect Hugo Dihm to build a new hall to fill the gap left by the demolition of the central pavilion. The new hall, however, was rather smaller than the baroque central pavilion.

=== 20th century ===
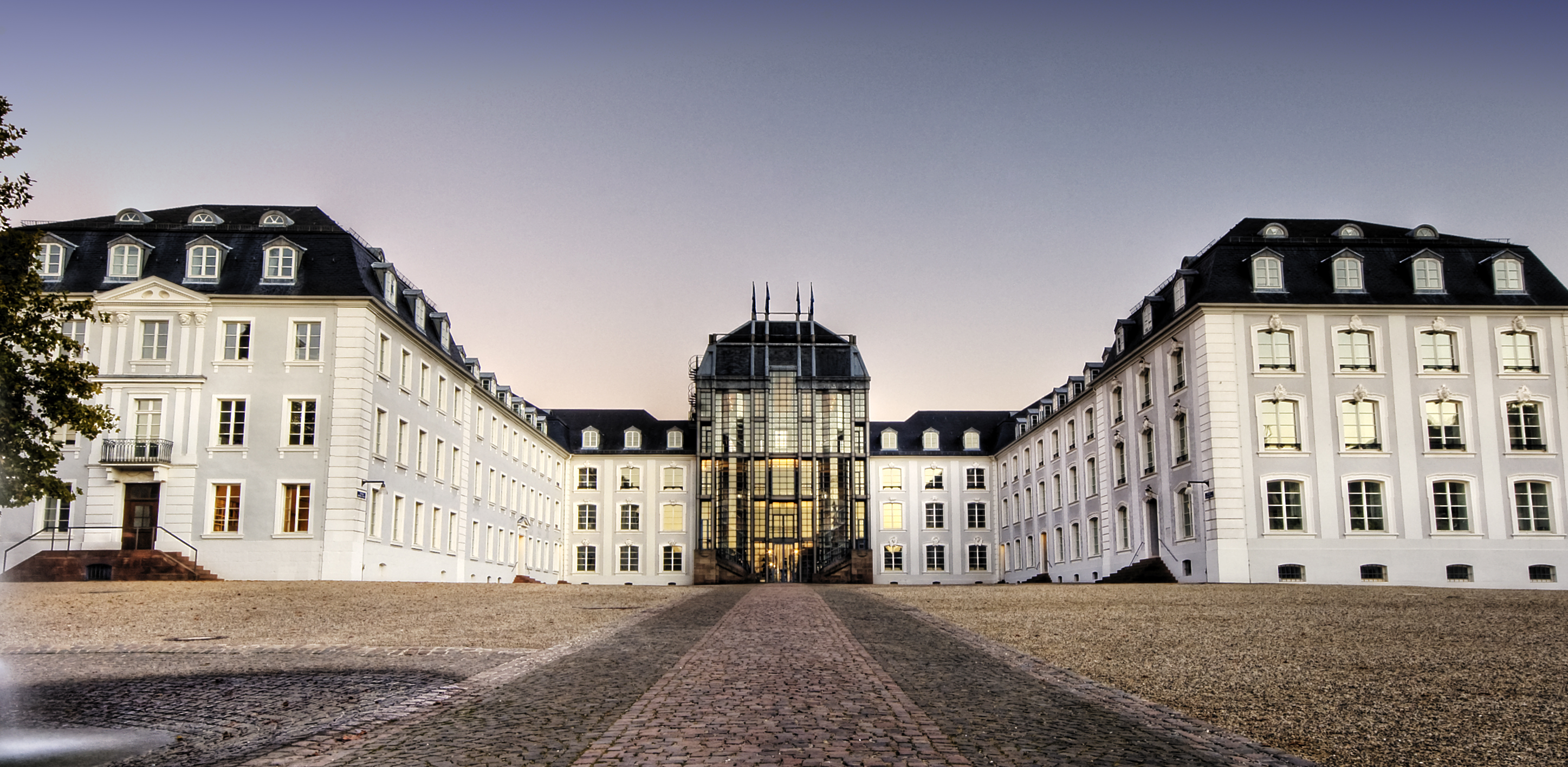
Saarbrücken Castle seen from the Old Town Hall

Between 1908 and 1920, the district of Saarbrücken gradually acquired the apartments, in order to use the building as the seat of district government. In 1938, a Neo-Baroque façade and a grand open-air staircase to the Cour d'honneur were added to the central building. During the Nazi era, the castle was the headquarters of the Gestapo. The western wing was partially destroyed during World War II and rebuilt in 1947 and 1948.

By 1969, the structural condition of the castle had deteriorated massively. Safety regulations mandated that the south wing be locked up immediately. Several plans were proposed for the reconstruction of the castle. Ideas ranged from reconstructing Stengel's baroque palace to completely demolishing the building. In 1981, the district of Saarbrücken decided to renovate the building and replace the central pavilion. Construction lasted from 1982 to 1989. The hall built by Dihm was torn down and replaced by a steel skeleton pavilion designed by the architect Gottfried Böhm, of the same size as the former baroque pavilion. Dihm's neo-baroque façade was retained, and the space between this façade and the new building was converted into a grand entrance hall. The hip roofs of the corner pavilions were replaced by gable roofs, similar to those on the baroque palace. Erich Fissabre and Alfred Werner Maurer had previously made the reconstruction drawings and the inventory of the baroque castle. In the course of this, the Dihm's central building was built over with a steel frame structure in the dimensions of the former baroque central.

== Current use ==
The Saarbrücken castle now serves as the administrative headquarters of the District of Saarbrücken.

The exhibition rooms of the Historical Museum Saar are housed in the vaulted cellar and a new annex. Casemates were uncovered during extensive excavations between 2003 and 2007. These can now be visited as part of the museum.
