= Friedrich Joachim Stengel =

German architect (1694–1787)

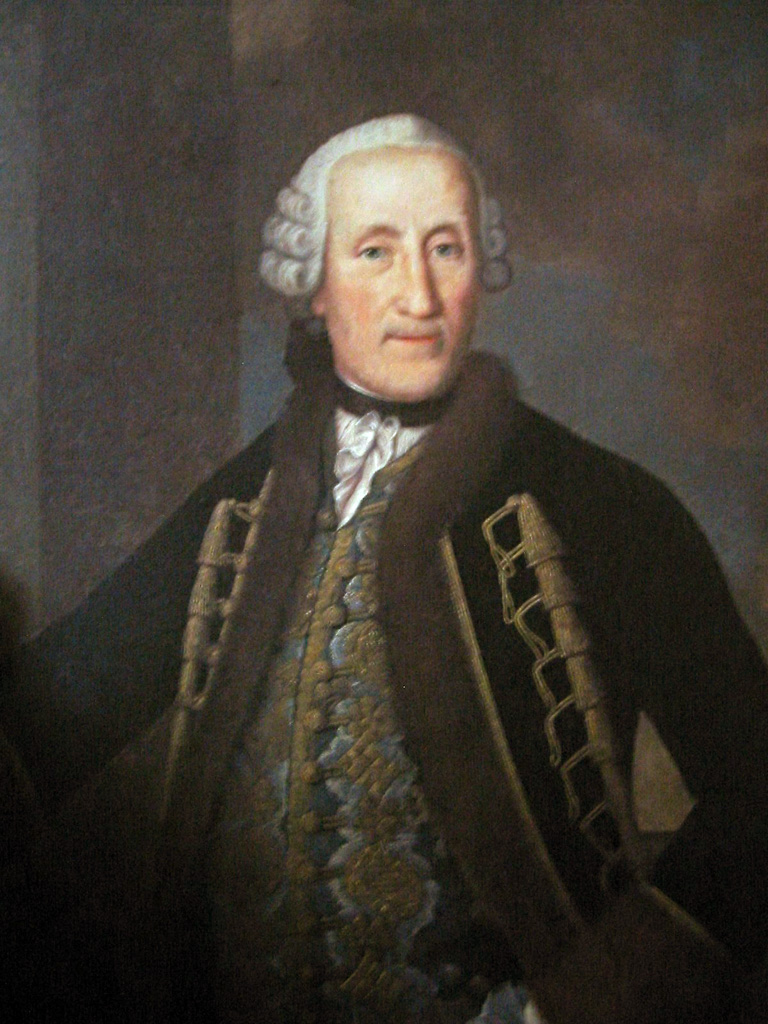
- Born: Friedrich Joachim Michael Stengel; 29 September 1694; Zerbst, Holy Roman Empire
- Died: 10 January 1787 (aged 92); Saarbrücken, Holy Roman Empire
- Education: Prussian Academy of Arts
- Occupations: Architect; master builder
- Years active: 1715–1775
- Spouses: Katharina Hoffman (m. 1720; died 1741); Klara Storch (m. 1742)

Signature
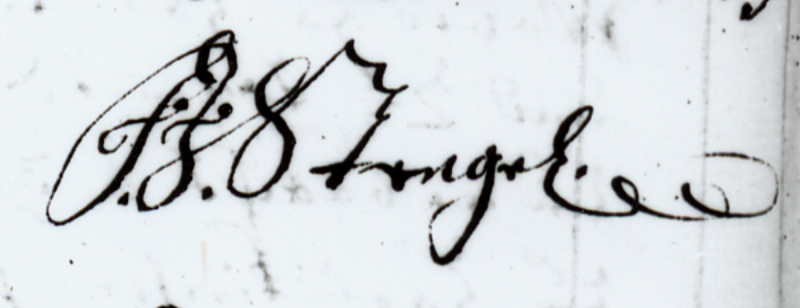

Friedrich Joachim Michael Stengel (29 September 1694 – 10 January 1787) was a German architect and baumeister.

== Early life ==
Friedrich Joachim Michael Stengel was born to a Protestant family in Zerbst. At the age of 14, Stengel moved to Berlin under the care of his mother's brother. He received his education from the Prussian Academy of Arts where he studied fortification engineering, civil architecture, artillery, and geometry.

In 1712, entered into military service in Saxe-Gotha as a cadet. He served several months in Northern Italy during the War of the Spanish Succession.

== Career ==
Stengel worked as a state surveyor for the duchies of Saxe-Gotha and Saxe-Eisenach from 1715 to 1719. While carrying out a "general state renovation" in Saxe-Eisenach, he met Adolphus von Dalberg which led to his employment in Fulda. There, he worked as a surveyor and building inspector until 1729 when he moved back to Gotha, hoping for work as a construction manager, although this was in vain.

In 1733, Stengel moved to Nassau-Usingen and worked as a court architect for Prince Charles. His major projects for the prince were the conversion of the Prinzenpalais and the renovation of Biebrich Palace. In 1735, William Henry, Prince of Nassau-Saarbrücken commissioned Stengel to write a report on the structural condition of the Saarbrücken Castle, which was to become William Henry's residence. Stengel reported on the structural deficiencies of the castle, and was subsequently commissioned to plan the new construction in 1738. The new palace was completed in 1748.

Stengel and his family moved to Saarbrücken in 1740. Together with William Henry, Stengel renovated and expanded Saarbrücken as a Baroque residential city, and worked as chief building director in many of the towns that belonged to Nassau-Saarbrücken. He drew up building codes, surveyed, and planned and constructed new urban spaces, commercial buildings, and residential buildings.

In 1751, Stengel was commissioned by Joanna Elisabeth of Holstein-Gottorp to rebuild Dornburg Castle. It was completed in 1758.

Stengel was appointed the General Building Director and Real Chamber Councilor of Nassau-Saarbrücken in 1761. He also served as the President of the Forest Chamber and director of the Saarbrücken orphanage, poorhouse, and penitentiary, before retiring in 1775.

== Personal life and death ==
In 1720, Stengel married Katharina Hoffmann. They had one daughter, Elisabeth Wilhelmina, born in 1722. Katharina later died in 1741. One year later, Stengel married Klara Storch, first maid of Princess Charlotte Amalie of Nassau-Dillenburg. They had two sons, Johann Friedrich and Balthasar Wilhelm. Both sons followed in their father's footsteps and became baumeisters.

Stengel died on 10 January 1787 at the age of 92. He was buried two days later in Saarbrücken.

== Selected works ==
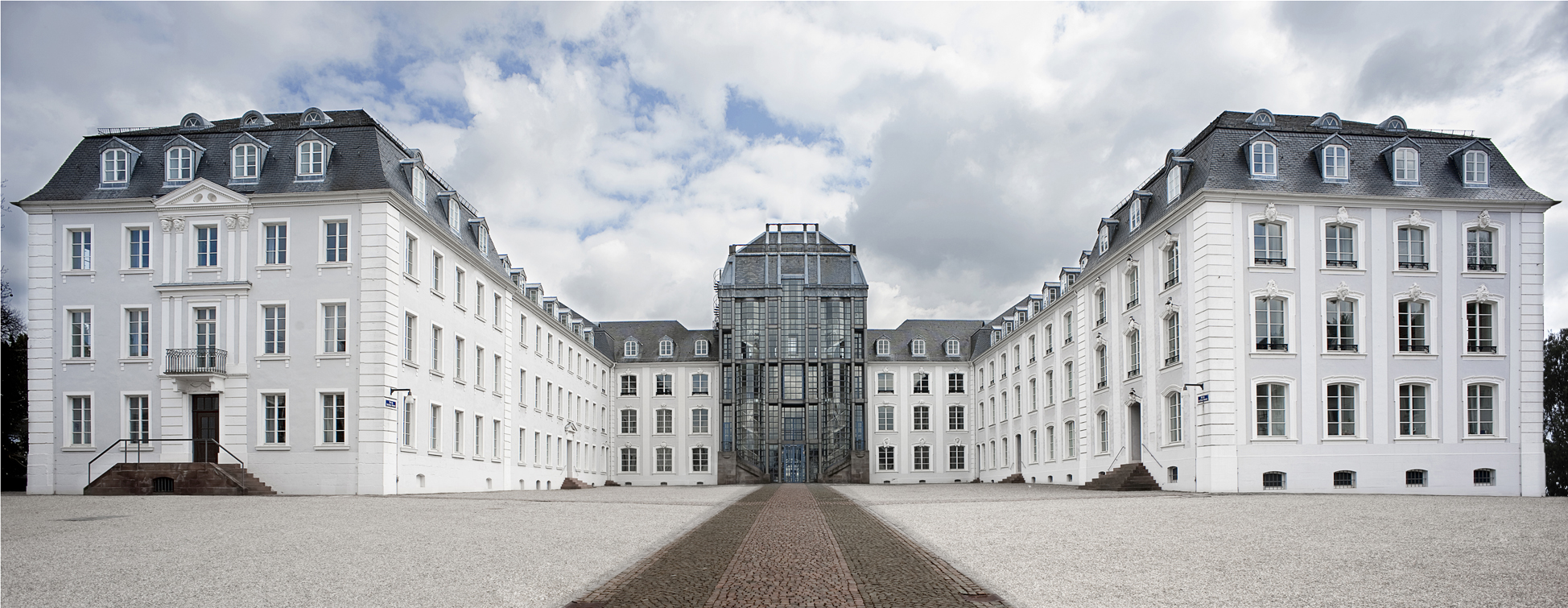
Saarbrücken Castle

- 1734–1740: Construction of the east and west wings of Biebrich Palace in Wiesbaden
- 1738–1748: Reconstruction of Saarbrücken Castle
- 1743–1751: Construction of Friedenskirche in Saarbrücken
- 1751–1758: Reconstruction of Dornburg Castle
- 1753–1765: Construction of Schloss Jägersberg in Neunkirchen
- 1754–1758: Construction of Basilica of St. John the Baptist in Saarbrücken
- 1762–1775: Construction of Ludwigskirche in Saarbrücken
