= Donata Mecklenburg-Solodkoff =

Mecklenburger royal

Duchess Donata of Mecklenburg
- Born: 11 March 1956 (age 70); Kiel, Schleswig-Holstein West Germany (now Germany)
- Spouse: Alexander von Solodkoff (m. 1987)
- Issue: Thyra von Solodkoff; Alix von Solodkoff; Niklos-Alexis von Solodkoff
- House: Mecklenburg-Schwerin
- Father: Duke Christian Louis of Mecklenburg
- Mother: Princess Barbara of Prussia

Duchess Donata of Mecklenburg (born 11 March 1956) is the senior remaining member of the House of Mecklenburg-Schwerin. Since there are no males left in the family, the Schwerin branch itself is considered extinct due to the Salic law of succession, leaving Mecklenburg-Strelitz as the only remaining line of the House of Mecklenburg.

== Duchess of Mecklenburg ==
She was born in Kiel in the state of Schleswig-Holstein the eldest daughter of Duke Christian Louis of Mecklenburg-Schwerin and his wife Princess Barbara of Prussia (1920-1994). Her father was the younger brother to the last surviving male of the House of Mecklenburg-Schwerin, Friedrich Franz, Hereditary Grand Duke of Mecklenburg-Schwerin. Her mother was the daughter of Princess Charlotte of Saxe-Altenburg, the eldest daughter of Ernst II, the last duke of Saxe-Altenburg.

Donata had only one sister Edwina (born 25 September 1960), and as her uncle had no children the House of Mecklenburg-Schwerin became extinct in the male line in 2001 when her uncle died. As a result, the Mecklenburg-Strelitz line, headed by Borwin, Duke of Mecklenburg, will become the only surviving line of the House of Mecklenburg when both Donata and Edwina are dead.

Her paternal grandfather was the last reigning Grand Duke of Mecklenburg-Schwerin, Frederick Francis IV. She is also a descendant of Christian IX of Denmark as her paternal grandmother, Alexandra of Hanover and Cumberland, a daughter of Ernest Augustus, Crown Prince of Hanover and Princess Thyra of Denmark, was the youngest daughter and fifth child of Christian IX of Denmark and Louise of Hesse-Kassel. Her maternal grandfather was Prince Sigismund of Prussia, a grandson of Grand Duke Louis IV and Alice, Grand Duchess of Hesse and by Rhine, the second daughter of Queen Victoria.

== Marriage and children ==
She married Alexander von Solodkoff on 19 September 1987, and had three children:

- Thyra von Solodkoff (b.1989)
- Alix von Solodkoff (b.1992)
- Niklos-Alexis von Solodkoff (b.1994)

== Sources ==
- Marlene A. Eilers, Queen Victoria's Descendants (Baltimore, Maryland: Genealogical Publishing Co., 1987), page 161-162.
