= Duke Christian Louis of Mecklenburg =

German noble (1912–1996)

Duke Christian Louis
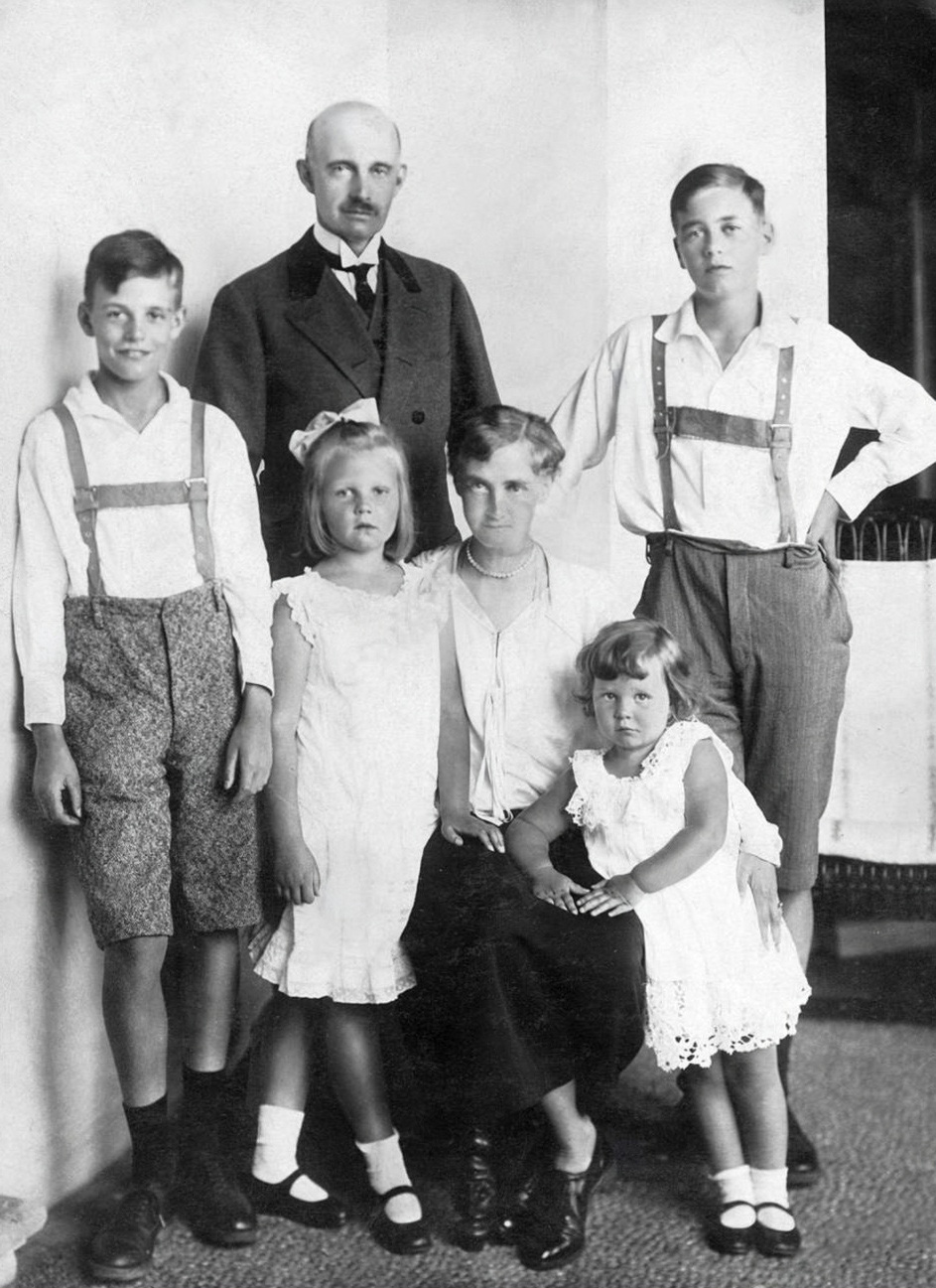
- Christian Louis with his family in 1925. From left to right: Christian Louis, Frederick Francis IV, Thyra, Alexandra, Anastasia and Friedrich Franz
- Born: 29 September 1912; Ludwigslust, Mecklenburg-Schwerin
- Died: 18 July 1996 (aged 83); Gut Hemmelmark, Germany
- Spouse: Princess Barbara of Prussia (m. 1954; died 1994)
- Issue: Duchess Donata; Duchess Edwina
Names
- Christian Louis Ernest Augustus Maximilian John Albert Adolphus Frederick; German: Christian Ludwig Ernst August Maximilian Johann Albrecht Adolf Friedrich
- House: Mecklenburg-Schwerin
- Father: Frederick Francis IV, Grand Duke of Mecklenburg
- Mother: Princess Alexandra of Hanover

Duke Christian Louis of Mecklenburg (German: Christian-Ludwig Herzog zu Mecklenburg; 29 September 1912 – 18 July 1996) was the second son of the last reigning Grand Duke of Mecklenburg-Schwerin, Frederick Francis IV.

== Early life ==
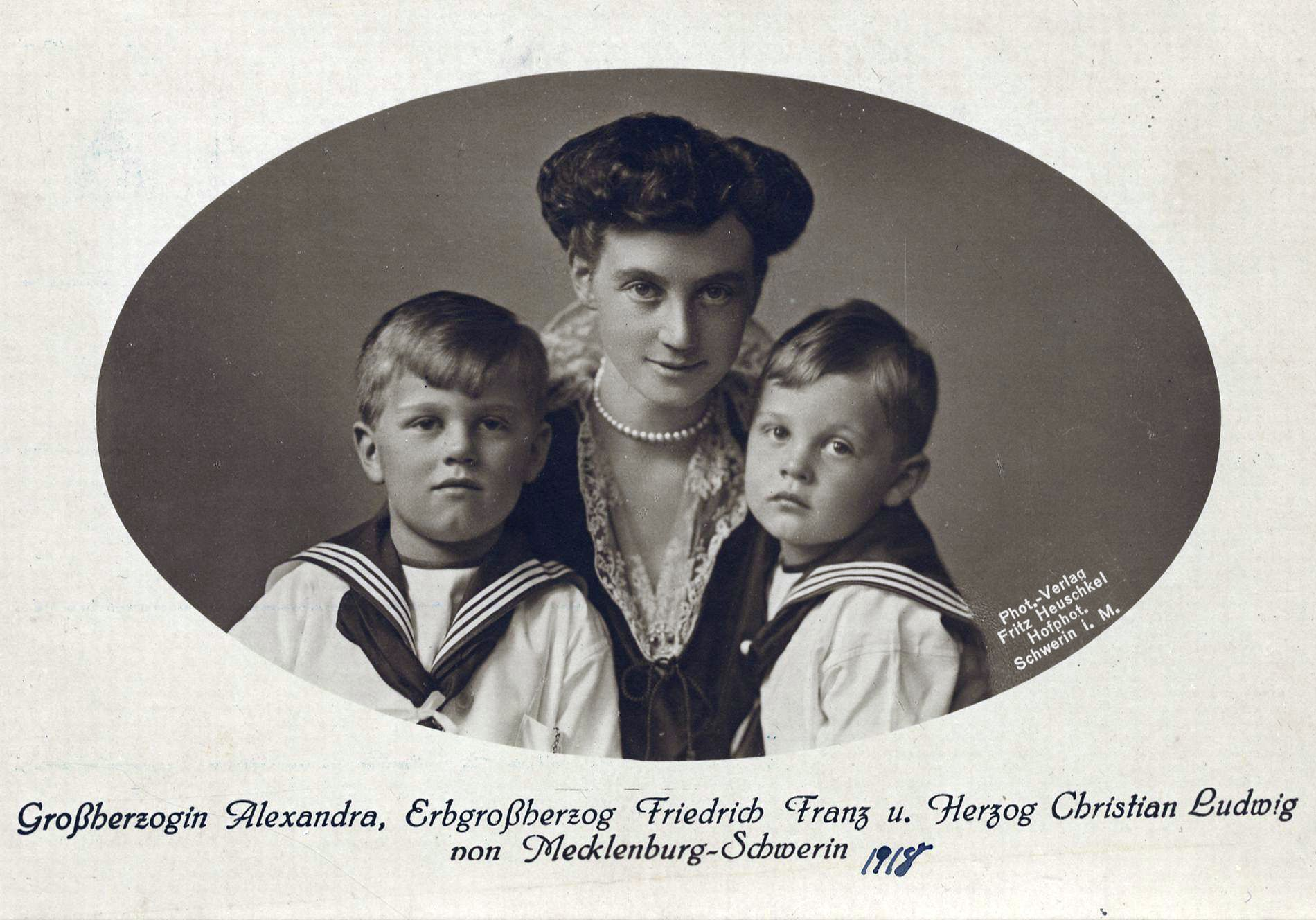
Christian Ludwig (on right) with his mother and his elder brother (1918)

Born in Schloss Ludwigslust, as a member of an elder, Mecklenburg-Schwerin line of an ancient House of Mecklenburg, he was the second child of the reigning Grand Duke of Mecklenburg-Schwerin, Frederick Francis IV, and his wife, Princess Alexandra of Hanover, third child and second daughter of Ernest Augustus, Crown Prince of Hanover and Princess Thyra of Denmark.

Following the defeat of the German Empire in World War I, his father formally abdicated on 14 November 1918 and the monarchy was abolished.

After the abolition of the monarchy, in 1919 the family went at the invitation of Queen Alexandrine, consort of Christian X of Denmark and sister of the Grand Duke, into exile in Denmark, where they lived for a year in Sorgenfri Palace. Later, the family returned to Mecklenburg and lived in Gelbensande, and from 1921 the family settled at Ludwigslust Castle. After finishing school, in the autumn of 1935, he went as a recruit in the cavalry regiment 14 in Ludwigslust, with whom he was drafted in 1939 into World War II. In 1944, he was dismissed because of a decree as being a member of a former ruling house of the armed forces.

== After the war ==
When the war ended, Ludwigslust was first occupied by the British, but soon was transferred to the Soviet occupation, so that Christian Louis initially went with his family to Glücksburg Castle in Schleswig-Holstein. But he soon returned to Ludwigslust to take care of the family property and was taken prisoner by the Soviet military authorities. After imprisonment he was flown to Moscow, where he was sentenced in the Lubyanka prison to be imprisoned for 25 years.

In 1953, he was released after the intervention of Konrad Adenauer for German POWs in the Soviet Union and came back to Christmas 1953 with his family in Glücksburg. Together with his sister Thyra, he took part in the ship tour organized by Queen Frederica and her husband King Paul of Greece in 1954, which became known as the "Cruise of the Kings" and was attended by over 100 royals from all over Europe.

== Marriage and family ==
On 5 July 1954 in Glücksburg, Christian Louis married in a civil wedding Princess Barbara of Prussia (1920–1994), the daughter of Prince Sigismund of Prussia and his wife, Princess Charlotte of Saxe-Altenburg. They married in a religious ceremony on 11 July 1954. They had two daughters:

- Duchess Donata of Mecklenburg (b. 11 March 1956), married Alexander von Solodkoff and had issue:
  - Thyra von Solodkoff (b.1989)
  - Alix von Solodkoff (b.1992)
  - Niklos-Alexis von Solodkoff (b.1994)
- Duchess Edwina of Mecklenburg (b. 25 September 1960), married Konrad von Posern and had issue.
  - Ludwig Leopold Bernhard Georg Maria von Posern (b.1996), married Luise Horsch
  - Paul Friedrich Christian Fabian Maria von Posern (b.1997)
  - Ferdinand Johann Albrecht Maria von Posern (b.1999)

== Ancestry ==
Ancestors of Duke Christian Louis of Mecklenburg

16. Paul Frederick, Grand Duke of Mecklenburg-Schwerin
8. Frederick Francis II, Grand Duke of Mecklenburg-Schwerin
17. Princess Alexandrine of Prussia
4. Frederick Francis III, Grand Duke of Mecklenburg-Schwerin
18. Prince Heinrich LXIII Reuss of Köstritz
9. Princess Augusta Reuss of Köstritz
19. Countess Eleonore of Stolberg-Wernigerode
2. Frederick Francis IV, Grand Duke of Mecklenburg-Schwerin
20. Nicholas I of Russia
10. Grand Duke Michael Nikolaevich of Russia
21. Princess Charlotte of Prussia
5. Grand Duchess Anastasia Mikhailovna of Russia
22. Leopold, Grand Duke of Baden
11. Princess Cecilie of Baden
23. Princess Sophie of Sweden
1. Duke Christian Louis of Mecklenburg-Schwerin
24. Ernest Augustus of Hanover
12. George V of Hanover
25. Princess Frederica of Mecklenburg-Strelitz
6. Ernest Augustus, Crown Prince of Hanover
26. Joseph, Duke of Saxe-Altenburg
13. Princess Marie of Saxe-Altenburg
27. Duchess Amelia of Württemberg
3. Princess Alexandra of Hanover
28. Frederick William, Duke of Schleswig-Holstein-Sonderburg-Glücksburg
14. Christian IX of Denmark
29. Princess Louise Caroline of Hesse-Kassel
7. Princess Thyra of Denmark
30. Prince William of Hesse-Kassel
15. Princess Louise of Hesse-Kassel
31. Princess Charlotte of Denmark

== Sources ==
- Alexander Solodkoff: Christian Ludwig Herzog zu Mecklenburg: Mecklenburg-Schwerin, Club Wien 2003, ISBN 3-933781-28-0
- Alison Weir: Britain's Royal Family: A Complete Genealogy, The Bodley Head, London 1999, S: 292
- Marlene A. Eilers: Queen Victoria's Descendants, Genealogical Publishing Co., Baltimore 1987, S. 161, 162, 169
- Peter Hoffmann: Stauffenbergs Freund – Die tragische Geschichte des Widerstandskämpfers Joachim Kuhn, Verlag C.H.Beck München 2007, ISBN 978-3-406-55810-8
- Peter Hoffmann: Oberst i.G. Henning von Tresckow und die Staatsstreichspläne im Jahr 1943, in: Vierteljahrshefte für Zeitgeschichte, Vol 55, 2, April 2007, S. 331–364
- Christian Ludwig von Mecklenburg: Erzählungen aus meinem Leben, Schwerin, 3. Auflage31998, ISBN 3-910179-75-4
