= Friedrich Franz, Hereditary Grand Duke of Mecklenburg-Schwerin =

Heir to the Grand Duchy of Mecklenburg-Schwerin (1910–2001)

Friedrich Franz
- Hereditary Grand Duke of Mecklenburg-Schwerin
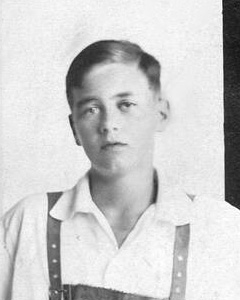
- Friedrich Franz in 1925

Head of the House of Mecklenburg-Schwerin
- Tenure: 17 November 1945 – 31 July 2001
- Predecessor: Frederick Francis IV
- Successor: Borwin, Duke of Mecklenburg
- Born: 22 April 1910; Schwerin, Mecklenburg-Schwerin, Germany
- Died: 31 July 2001 (aged 91); Hamburg, Germany
- Spouse: Karin Elisabeth von Schaper (m. 1941; div. 1967) (m. 1977)
Names
- Friedrich Franz Michael Wilhelm Nikolaus Franz-Joseph Ernst August Hans
- House: House of Mecklenburg-Schwerin
- Father: Frederick Francis IV, Grand Duke of Mecklenburg-Schwerin
- Mother: Princess Alexandra of Hanover

Friedrich Franz, Hereditary Grand Duke of Mecklenburg-Schwerin (German: Friedrich Franz Erbgroßherzog von Mecklenburg-Schwerin; 22 April 1910 – 31 July 2001) was the heir apparent to the throne of Mecklenburg-Schwerin and a member of the Waffen-SS.

== Early life ==
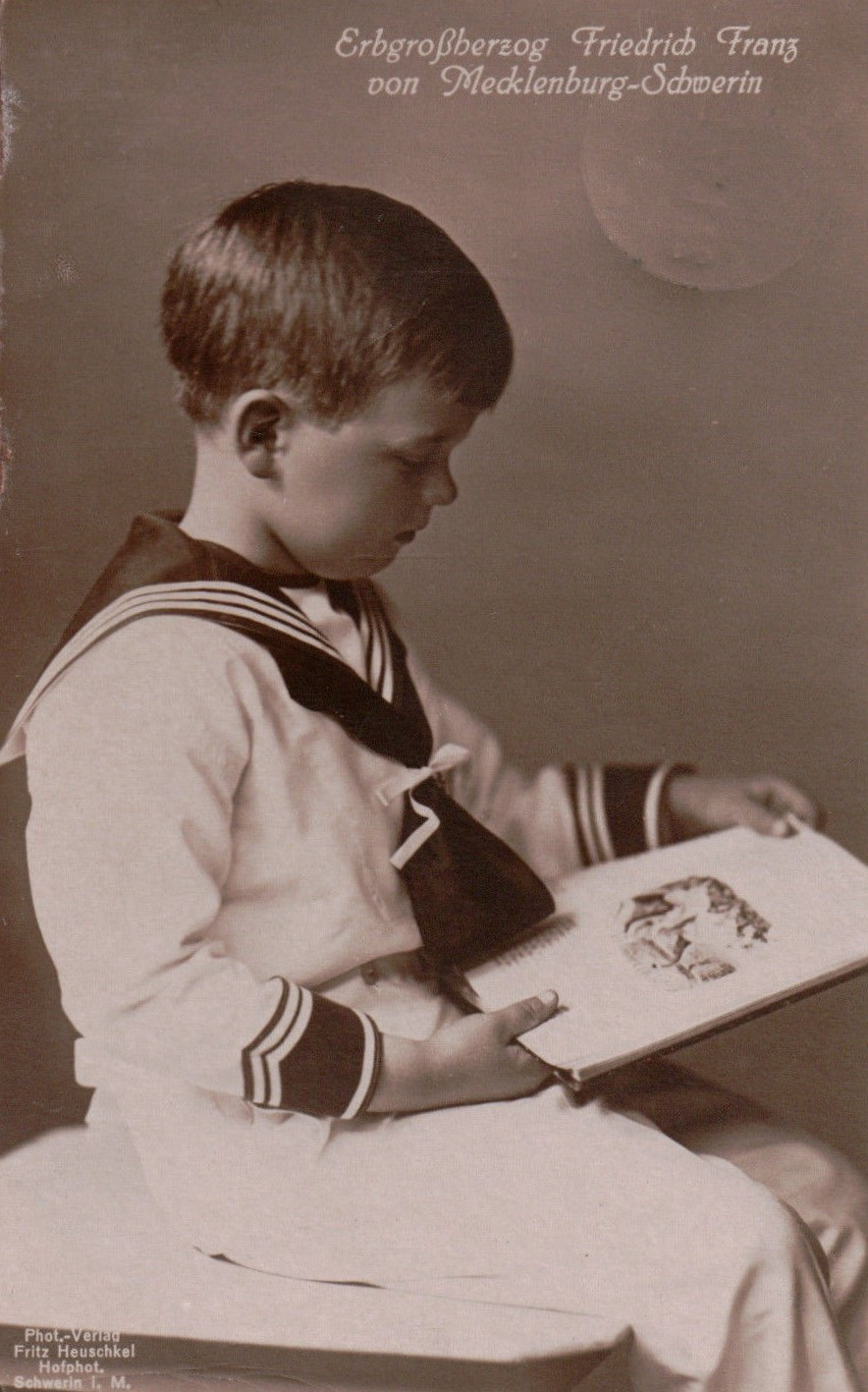
Friedrich Franz in c. 1918

He was born in Schwerin, the eldest child of the reigning Grand Duke of Mecklenburg-Schwerin, Frederick Francis IV, and his wife Princess Alexandra of Hanover, a daughter of Crown Prince Ernest Augustus of Hanover (a first-cousin once removed of Queen Victoria) and Princess Thyra of Denmark, the youngest daughter of King Christian IX of Denmark. Following the defeat of the German Empire in World War I, his father abdicated on 14 November 1918. He did not succeed to the throne, as the Grand Duchy was replaced with the Free State of Mecklenburg-Schwerin.

Upon the promulgation of the Weimar Constitution on 11 August 1919, titles of sovereigns such as emperor/empress, king/queen, grand duke/grand duchess, etc. were abolished. However, former titles shared and inherited by all members of the family were retained but incorporated into the surname. He therefore became known as Friedrich Franz Herzog von Mecklenburg-Schwerin (or Friedrich Franz, Duke of Mecklenburg-Schwerin) de facto since the establishment of the Free State of Mecklenburg-Schwerin.

== Post monarchy ==
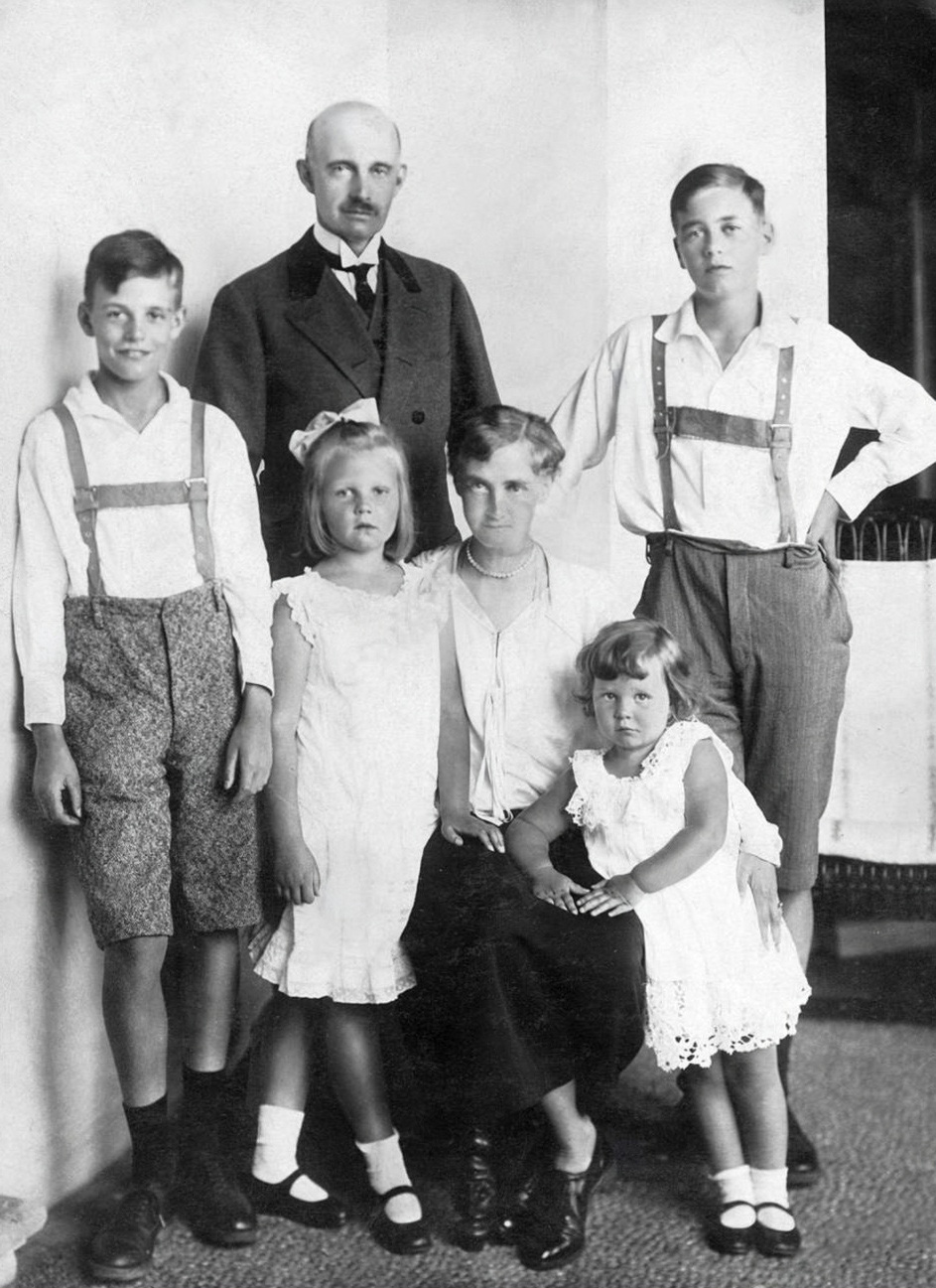
The Grand Duke and Grand Duchess with their children in 1925. From left to right: Duke Christian Louis, Grand Duke Frederick Francis, Duchess Thyra, Grand Duchess Alexandra, Duchess Anastasia and Hereditary Grand Duke Friedrich Franz.

In May 1931 against the will of his father, Friedrich Franz joined the SS and by 1936 he had been promoted to the rank of Hauptsturmführer (Captain).

He was posted to Denmark during World War II where he worked at the German embassy as a personal aide to Werner Best. He spent the summer months of 1944 serving with the Waffen-SS tank corps.

In May 1943, a family council was called by the Grand Ducal family and Friedrich Franz was passed over as heir (of the family estates) in favour of his younger brother Duke Christian Louis, who would instead inherit the family property.

Friedrich Franz married Karin Elisabeth von Schaper, the daughter of Walter von Schaper and his wife Baroness Louise von Münchhausen, on 11 June 1941 at Schloß Wiligrad, near the Lake Schwerin. They divorced on 22 September 1967, but remarried a decade later in Glücksburg on 27 April 1977.

== Ancestry ==
Ancestors of Friedrich Franz, Hereditary Grand Duke of Mecklenburg-Schwerin

8. Frederick Francis II, Grand Duke of Mecklenburg-Schwerin
4. Frederick Francis III, Grand Duke of Mecklenburg-Schwerin
9. Princess Augusta Reuss of Köstritz
2. Frederick Francis IV, Grand Duke of Mecklenburg-Schwerin
10. Grand Duke Michael Nikolaevich of Russia
5. Grand Duchess Anastasia Mikhailovna of Russia
11. Princess Cecilie of Baden
1. Frederick Francis, Hereditary Grand Duke of Mecklenburg-Schwerin
12. George V of Hanover
6. Ernest Augustus, Crown Prince of Hanover
13. Princess Marie of Saxe-Altenburg
3. Princess Alexandra of Hanover
14. Christian IX of Denmark
7. Princess Thyra of Denmark
15. Princess Louise of Hesse-Kassel

== Sources ==
- Petropoulos, Jonathan (2006). Royals and the Reich: The Princes Von Hessen in Nazi Germany. Oxford University Press. ISBN 0-19-516133-5.
- Huberty, Michel; Alain Giraud; F. et B. Magdelaine (1945). L'Allemagne Dynastique, Tome VI : Bade-Mecklembourg. ISBN 978-2-901138-06-8.

Friedrich Franz, Hereditary Grand Duke of Mecklenburg-Schwerin House of Mecklenburg-Schwerin Cadet branch of the House of Mecklenburg Born: 22 April 1910 Died: 31 July 2001
Titles in pretence
Preceded by Friedrich Franz IV	— TITULAR — Grand Duke of Mecklenburg-Schwerin; 17 November 1945 – 31 July 2001; Reason for succession failure: Grand Duchy abolished in 1918	Succeeded by Borwin, Duke of Mecklenburg
