= Prince Sigismund of Prussia =

Prince Sigismund of Prussia may refer to:

- Prince Sigismund of Prussia (1864–1866), son of Frederick III
- Prince Sigismund of Prussia (1896–1978), grandson of Wilhelm II
