= Frederick Francis IV =

Grand Duke of Mecklenburg-Schwerin from 1897 to 1918

- Frederick Francis IV in 1913

Grand Duke of Mecklenburg-Schwerin
- Reign: 10 April 1897 – 14 November 1918
- Predecessor: Frederick Francis III
- Successor: Monarchy abolished
- Born: 9 April 1882; Palermo, Kingdom of Italy
- Died: 17 November 1945 (aged 63); Flensburg, Germany
- Spouse: Princess Alexandra of Hanover (m. 1904)
- Issue: Friedrich Franz, Hereditary Grand Duke of Mecklenburg-Schwerin; Duke Christian Louis; Duchess Olga; Duchess Thyra; Anastasia, Princess Friedrich Ferdinand of Schleswig-Holstein-Sonderburg-Glücksburg
- House: Mecklenburg-Schwerin
- Father: Frederick Francis III, Grand Duke of Mecklenburg-Schwerin
- Mother: Grand Duchess Anastasia Mikhailovna of Russia

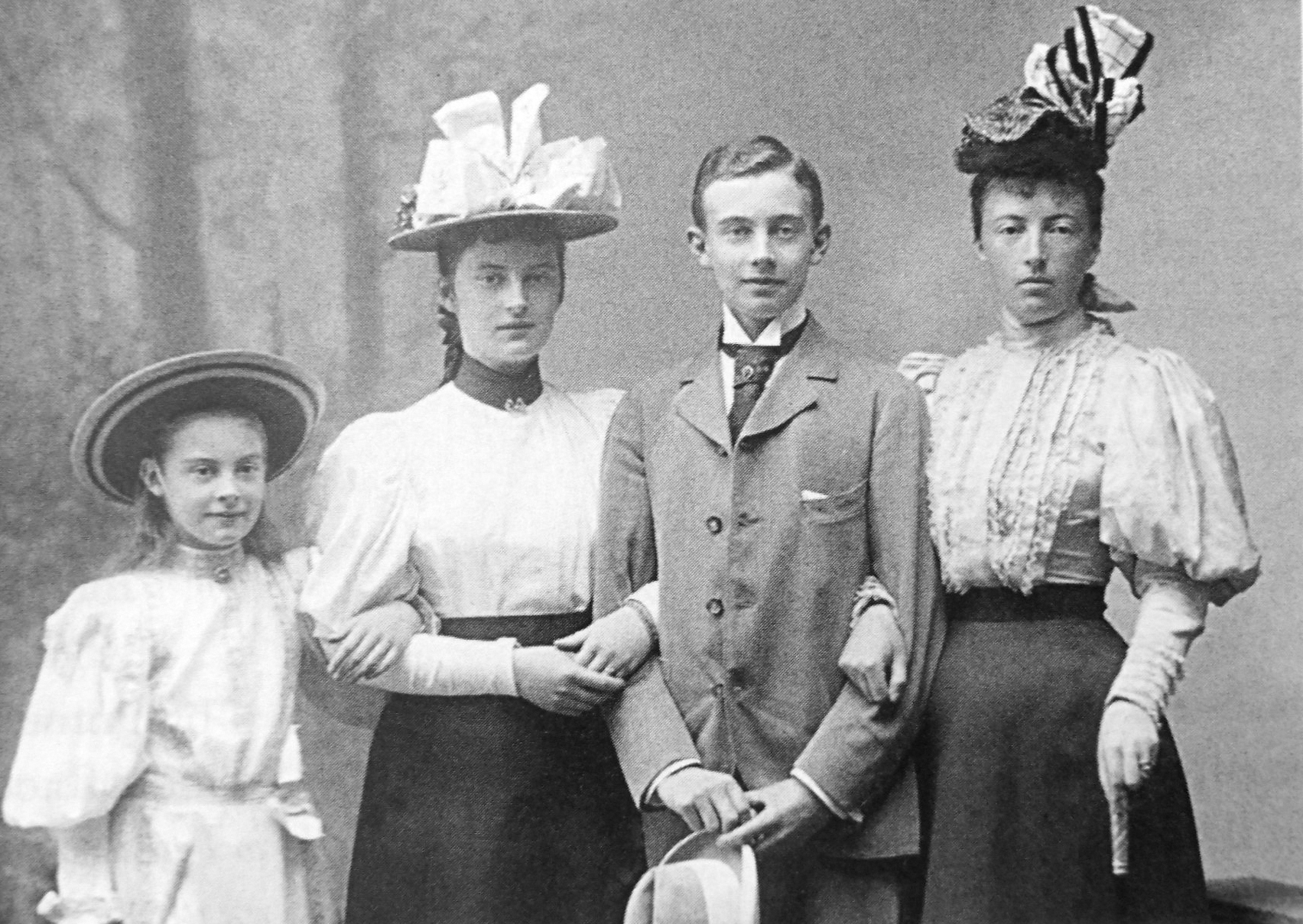
Cecilie, Alexandrine and Frederick Francis of Mecklenburg-Schwerin with their mother Grand Duchess Anastasia.

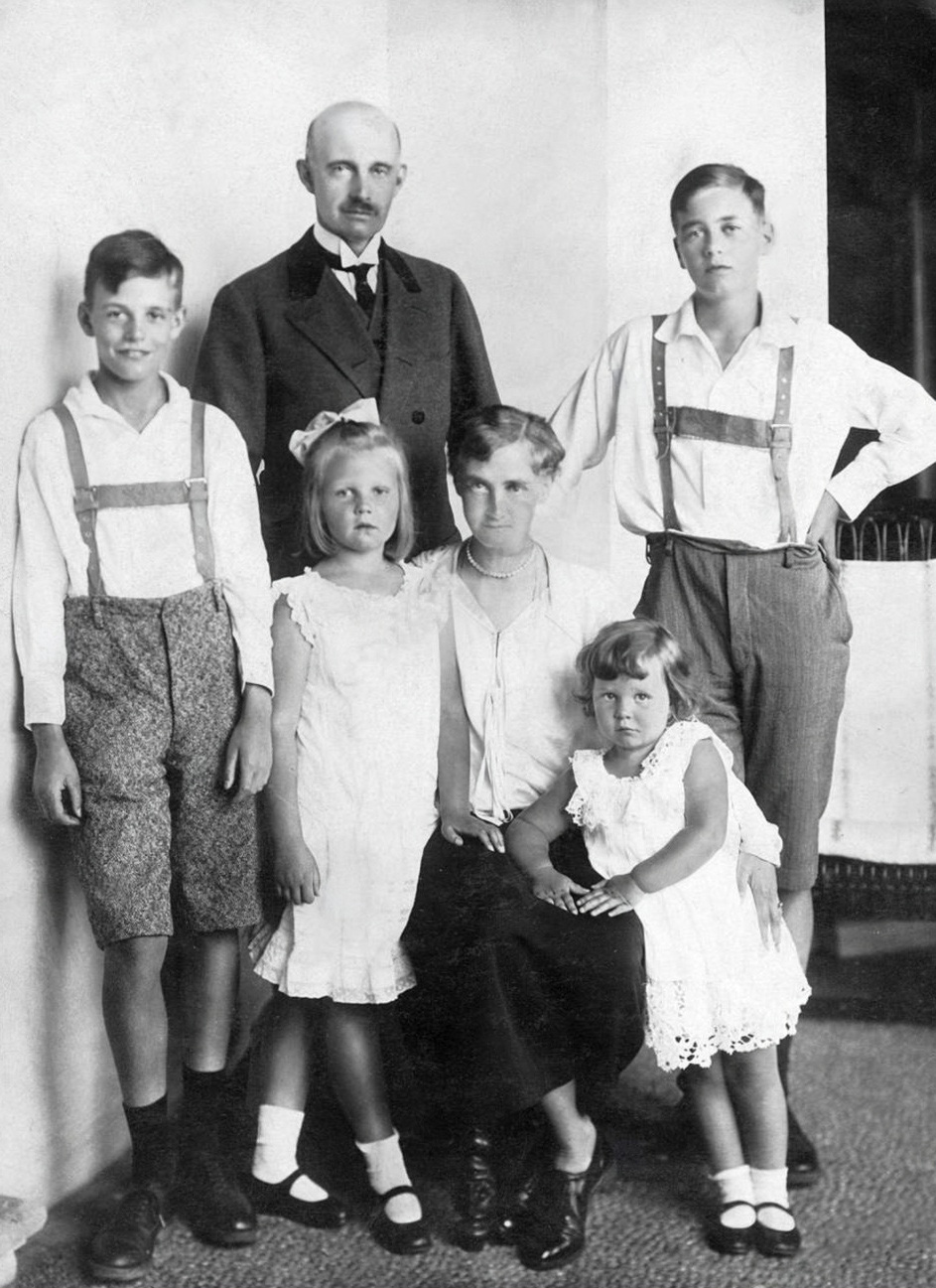
The Grand Duke and Grand Duchess with their children, 1925 Left to right: Christian Louis, Frederick Francis, Thyra, Alexandra, Anastasia and Friedrich Franz.

Frederick Francis IV (Friedrich Franz Michael; 9 April 1882 – 17 November 1945) was the last Grand Duke of Mecklenburg-Schwerin and regent of Mecklenburg-Strelitz. He inherited the throne when he was fifteen years old in 1897 and was forced to renounce it in 1918.

== Early life ==
Born on 9 April 1882, Duke Frederick Francis IV was the son of Frederick Francis, then the hereditary grand duke of Mecklenburg-Schwerin, and Grand Duchess Anastasia Mikhailovna of Russia. He was born in Palermo, Sicily at Villa Belmonte where his parents were staying to alleviate the faltering health of the hereditary Grand duke. Frederick Francis's father suffered from a weak heart, chronic asthma, and acute eczema and had to live part of the year away from Mecklenburg in a warmer climate. Frederick Francis's mother, raised in the splendor of the Russian imperial court and the Orthodox church, never got used to the provincial austerity of the Lutheran court of Schwerin, preferring to live abroad.

Frederick Francis was one year old when he became the hereditary grand duke of Mecklenburg-Schwerin at the death of his grandfather Grand Duke Frederick Francis II on 15 April 1883. Frederick Francis IV had an older sister, Alexandrine and a younger one, Cecilie. The three children were raised with simplicity and a lot of freedom by royal standards. Theirs was a polyglot household. The three siblings, who would remain very close throughout their lives, learned English, French, German and Russian. The family spent only half of the year in Schwerin during the summer months. They stayed as little time as possible in Schwerin Castle surrounded by a lake, preferring Gelbensande, a hunting lodge near Rostock and the Baltic Sea. There, the family led the simple life they preferred. Friederich Franz III spent most his time hunting, while Anastasia and the children rode or drove out, visited local people or enjoyed the beach and the surrounding forest. Every year from November until May, they lived in Villa Welden in Cannes where they sailed with their father and swam in the Mediterranean. On their journey back to Germany they stopped in Paris.

== Grand Duke of Mecklenburg-Schwerin ==
Frederick Francis IV succeeded his father as Grand Duke upon his death on 10 April 1897. He had just turned fifteen the day before. As he was a teenager, due to his minority, the grand duchy was governed by his uncle Duke Johann Albrecht as regent. Frederick Francis's mother, Grand Duchess Anastasia preferred to remain in France while he continued the long preparation to eventually assume the throne. The following year, his older sister, Alexandrine married the Danish Crown Prince (future King Christian X in 1912). His mother and younger sister Cecile visited him frequently in Dresden and during their stays, they would go out for long drives in a carriage and horses bought for him from Schwerin. In 1903, the young Grand Duke moved to Bonn, where he attended university and studied administration and law. Adolf Langfeld was appointed as his study advisor.

On 9 April 1901 Frederick Francis came of age, ending the regency and beginning his reign in Schwerin. He immediately began working on a reform of the constitution, but it failed in the face of opposition from parliament.

=== Marriage and issue ===
On 7 June 1904, Frederick Francis married Princess Alexandra of Hanover in Gmunden. She was the second eldest daughter of Ernest Augustus, Crown Prince of Hanover, and his wife, Princess Thyra of Denmark, a daughter of King Christian IX.

They had five children:

- Friedrich Franz, Hereditary Grand Duke of Mecklenburg-Schwerin (22 April 1910 – 31 July 2001)
- Duke Christian Louis (29 September 1912 – 18 July 1996) married Princess Barbara of Prussia, daughter of Prince Sigismund of Prussia
- Duchess Olga (1916–1917)
- Duchess Thyra (18 June 1919 – 27 September 1981)
- Duchess Anastasia (11 November 1922 – 25 January 1979) married Prince Friedrich Ferdinand of Schleswig-Holstein-Sonderburg-Glücksburg

=== Abdication ===
Following the 1918 suicide of Grand Duke Adolphus Frederick VI of Mecklenburg-Strelitz, Frederick Francis took up the regency of Strelitz. This happened because the heir presumptive, Duke Charles Michael, was serving in the Imperial Russian Army at the time and had indicated that he wished to renounce his succession rights. Frederick Francis abdicated the grand ducal throne on 14 November 1918 following the German Empire's defeat in World War I; the regency over the Grand Duchy of Mecklenburg-Strelitz ended at the same time.

=== Later life and death ===
After his abdication, he was initially not allowed to live in Mecklenburg and had to move to Denmark. A year later, he was permitted to return. He recovered some of his former properties and occupied some of his former homes. Frederick Francis died on 17 November 1945 in Flensburg, at the age of 63, after being arrested by No6 RAF Security section on 9 November 1945. He was succeeded as head of the grand ducal house by his son Hereditary Grand Duke Friedrich Franz.

== Honours ==
German decorations

- Mecklenburg:
  - Grand Cross of the Wendish Crown, with Collar and Crown in Ore
  - Grand Cross of the Griffon
  - Memorial Medal for Grand Duke Frederick Francis III
  - Commemorative Medal for the Battle of Loigny-Poupry
- Baden:
  - Knight of the House Order of Fidelity, 1902
  - Grand Cross of the Order of Berthold the First
- Bavaria: Knight of St. Hubert, 1911
- (Saxe-Coburg and Gotha) (Duchy of Saxe-Altenburg) (Saxe-Meiningen) Ernestine duchies: Grand Cross of the Saxe-Ernestine House Order
- (Kingdom of Hanover) Hanoverian Royal Family:
  - Knight of St. George
  - Grand Cross of the Royal Guelphic Order
  - Grand Cross of the Order of Ernst August
- Hesse and by Rhine: Grand Cross of the Ludwig Order, 6 June 1905
- Oldenburg: Grand Cross of the Order of Duke Peter Friedrich Ludwig, with Collar and Golden Crown
- Prussia:
  - Knight of the Black Eagle, 11 June 1898; with Collar, 17 January 1902
  - Grand Cross of the Red Eagle
  - Grand Commander's Cross of the Royal House Order of Hohenzollern, with Collar
  - Commander of Honour of the Johanniter Order
  - Iron Cross (1914), 2nd and 1st Classes
- Saxe-Weimar-Eisenach: Grand Cross of the White Falcon, 1897
- Saxony: Knight of the Rue Crown, 1900

Foreign decorations

- Denmark:
  - Knight of the Elephant, 3 August 1897
  - Cross of Honour of the Order of the Dannebrog, 4 February 1906
  - King Christian IX Centenary Medal
- (Thailand) Siam: Knight of the Order of the Royal House of Chakri, with Collar, 2 April 1902
- Austria-Hungary: Grand Cross of St. Stephen, 1904
- Bulgaria:
  - Grand Cross of St. Alexander
  - Knight of Saints Cyril and Methodius
- Netherlands:
  - Grand Cross of the Netherlands Lion
  - 1901 Wedding Medal of Queen Wilhelmina and Duke Henry of Mecklenburg-Schwerin
- Russian Empire:
  - Knight of St. Andrew
  - Knight of St. Alexander Nevsky
  - Knight of the White Eagle
  - Knight of St. Anna, 1st Class
  - Knight of St. Stanislaus, 1st Class
- Sweden: Knight of the Seraphim, 21 May 1935

== Bibliography ==
- Zeepvat, Charlotte. The other Anastasia: A woman who loved and who lived. Royalty Digest Quarterly. N2 2006. ISSN 1653-5219.

Frederick Francis IV House of Mecklenburg-Schwerin Cadet branch of the House of Mecklenburg Born: 9 April 1882 Died: 17 November 1945
Regnal titles
Preceded by Frederick Francis III	Grand Duke of Mecklenburg-Schwerin; 1897–1918	Succeeded by Hugo Wendorff as President of the State Ministry
Preceded by Adolphus Frederick VI as grand duke	Regent of Mecklenburg-Strelitz; 1918	Succeeded by Peter Franz Stubmann as Chairman of the State Ministry
Titles in pretence
Loss of title Monarchy abolished	— TITULAR — Grand Duke of Mecklenburg-Schwerin; 1918–1945; Reason for succession failure: Grand Duchy abolished in 1918	Succeeded by Frederick Francis
