= Princess Alexandra of Hanover (born 1882) =

Grand Duchess of Mecklenburg-Schwerin from 1904 to 1918

Alexandra
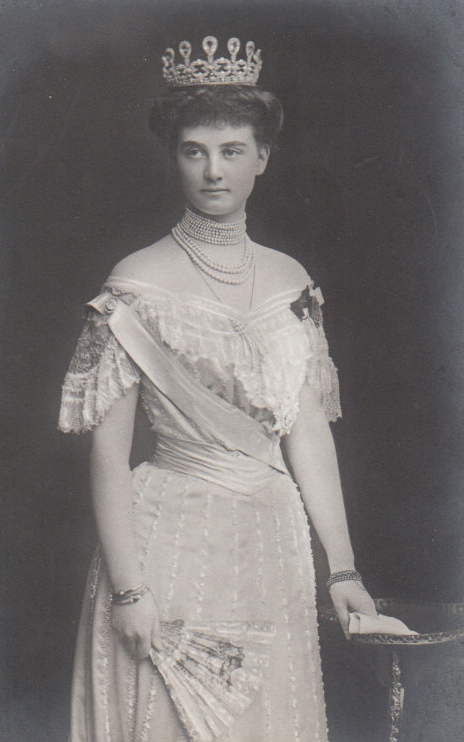
- Photo by Fritz Heuschkel the Elder, 1913

Grand Duchess consort of Mecklenburg-Schwerin
- Tenure: 7 June 1904 – 14 November 1918
- Born: 29 September 1882; Schloss Cumberland, Gmunden, Upper Austria, Austria-Hungary
- Died: 30 August 1963 (aged 80); Glücksburg Castle, Glücksburg, Schleswig-Holstein, West Germany
- Spouse: Frederick Francis IV, Grand Duke of Mecklenburg-Schwerin (m. 1904; died 1945)
- Issue: Friedrich Franz, Hereditary Grand Duke of Mecklenburg-Schwerin; Duke Christian Louis; Duchess Olga; Duchess Thyra; Anastasia, Princess Frederick Ferdinand of Schleswig-Holstein-Sonderburg-Glücksburg
Names
- Alexandra Louise Marie Olga Elisabeth Therese Vera; German: Alexandra Luise Marie Olga Elisabeth Therese Vera
- House: Hanover
- Father: Ernest Augustus, Crown Prince of Hanover
- Mother: Princess Thyra of Denmark

Princess Alexandra of Hanover (Alexandra Louise Marie Olga Elisabeth Therese Vera; 29 September 1882 – 30 August 1963) was Grand Duchess of Mecklenburg-Schwerin as the wife of Grand Duke Frederick Francis IV from their marriage on 7 June 1904 until the Grand Duke abdicated on 14 November 1918, following the German Revolution of 1918. Alexandra was the daughter of Ernest Augustus, Crown Prince of Hanover, and Princess Thyra of Denmark.

== Family ==
Alexandra was the second eldest daughter and third child of Ernest Augustus, Crown Prince of Hanover (1845–1923) and Princess Thyra of Denmark (1853–1933), the youngest daughter of Christian IX of Denmark (1818–1906) and Louise of Hesse-Kassel (1817–1898). Alexandra was a great-great-granddaughter of George III of the United Kingdom (1738–1820) and Charlotte of Mecklenburg-Strelitz (1744–1818).

== Marriage and issue ==
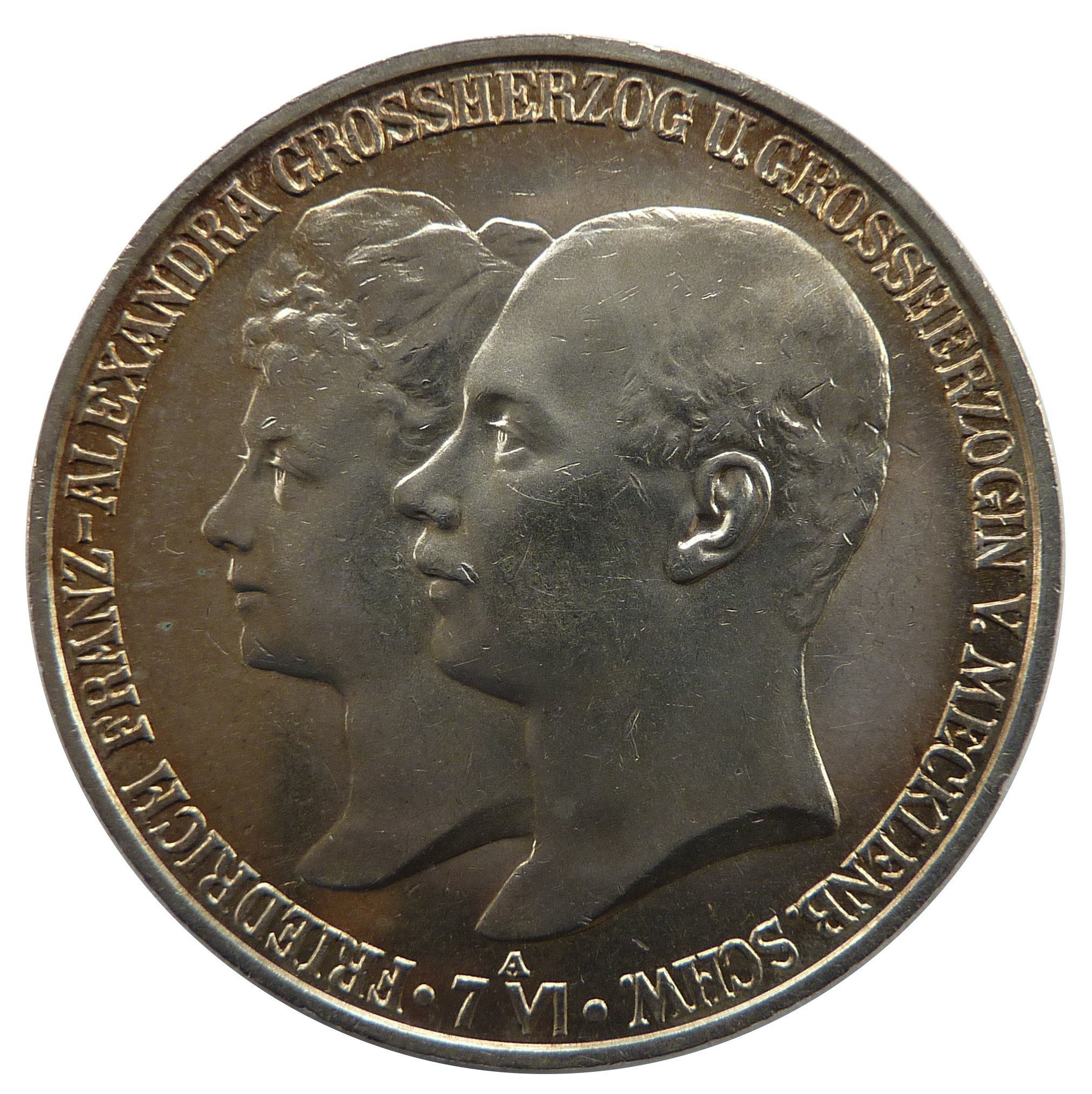
5 Mark coin of Alexandra's wedding

Alexandra married on 7 June 1904 in Gmunden, Austria-Hungary to Frederick Francis IV, Grand Duke of Mecklenburg-Schwerin (1882–1945), son of Frederick Francis III, Grand Duke of Mecklenburg-Schwerin and his wife Grand Duchess Anastasia Mikhailovna of Russia. The bridegroom gave Alexandra a diamond and aquamarine tiara by Faberge.

Alexandra and Frederick Francis had five children:

- Friedrich Franz, Hereditary Grand Duke of Mecklenburg-Schwerin (22 April 1910 – 31 July 2001). Married Karin Elisabeth von Schaper, daughter of Walter von Schaper and his wife Baroness Louise von Münchhausen. The couple had no issue.
- Duke Christian Louis of Mecklenburg (29 September 1912– 18 July 1996). Married Princess Barbara of Prussia, daughter of Prince Sigismund of Prussia and Princess Charlotte of Saxe-Altenburg. The couple had issue.
- Duchess Olga of Mecklenburg-Schwerin (1916–1917).
- Duchess Thyra of Mecklenburg-Schwerin (18 June 1919 – 27 September 1981).
- Duchess Anastasia of Mecklenburg-Schwerin (1922 – 1979). Married Prince Friedrich Ferdinand of Schleswig-Holstein-Sonderburg-Glücksburg, son of Prince Albrecht of Schleswig-Holstein-Sonderburg-Glücksburg and Countess Ortrud of Ysenburg and Büdingen. The couple had issue.

== Grand Duchess of Mecklenburg-Schwerin ==
In 1913, a fire broke out at Schwerin Castle while the Grand Duke and Duchess were dining there with guests. Everyone was able to make it out safely, although the grand ducal couple had to apparently rush through flying sparks when making their escape. There were a reported $750,000 in damages, in which countless works of art, as well as important rooms were utterly destroyed. Certain reports blamed the fire on a vengeful servant, although an official court announcement stated it was merely an electrical issue.

== Later life ==
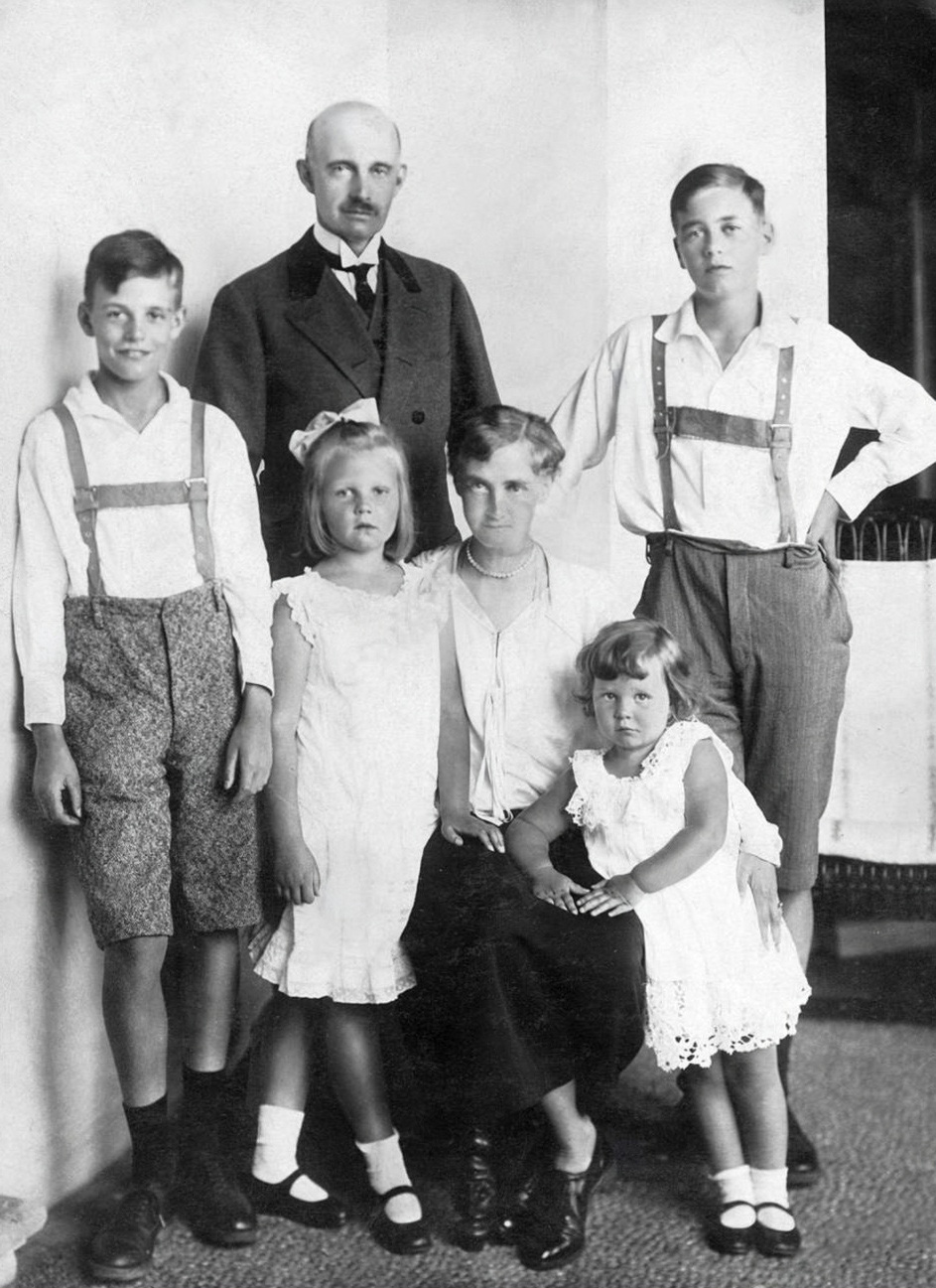
The Grand Duke and Grand Duchess with their children, 1925 Left to right: Christian Louis, Frederick Francis, Thyra, Alexandra, Anastasia and Friedrich Franz.

After the Grand Duke's forced abdication in 1918, the family briefly went into exile in Denmark, the native country of Alexandra's mother, Princess Thyra. After his death in 1945, the widowed Alexandra retired to the Glucksburg family estates in Schleswig-Holstein.

== Ancestry ==
Ancestors of Princess Alexandra of Hanover (born 1882)

8. Ernest Augustus, King of Hanover
4. George V of Hanover
9. Duchess Frederica of Mecklenburg-Strelitz
2. Ernest Augustus, Crown Prince of Hanover
10. Joseph, Duke of Saxe-Altenburg
5. Princess Marie of Saxe-Altenburg
11. Duchess Amelia of Württemberg
1. Princess Alexandra of Hanover
12. Friedrich Wilhelm, Duke of Schleswig-Holstein-Sonderburg-Glücksburg
6. Christian IX of Denmark
13. Princess Louise Caroline of Hesse-Kassel
3. Princess Thyra of Denmark
14. Prince William of Hesse-Kassel
7. Princess Louise of Hesse-Kassel
15. Princess Charlotte of Denmark

== Honours ==
- Mecklenburg: Grand Cross of the Wendish Crown, with Crown in Ore and in Diamonds
- Kingdom of Prussia: Dame of the Order of Louise, 1st Division

Princess Alexandra of Hanover (born 1882) House of Hanover Cadet branch of the House of Welf Born: 29 September 1882 Died: 30 August 1963
German royalty
Vacant Title last held by Grand Duchess Anastasia Mikhailovna of Russia	Grand Duchess consort of Mecklenburg-Schwerin; 7 June 1904 – 14 November 1918	Monarchy abolished German revolution
Titles in pretence
Loss of title Monarchy abolished	— TITULAR — Grand Duchess consort of Mecklenburg-Schwerin; 14 November 1918 – 17 November 1945; Reason for succession failure: Grand Duchy abolished in 1918	Succeeded by Karin Elisabeth von Schaper
