= Frederick Francis III =

Grand Duke of Mecklenburg-Schwerin from 1883 to 1897

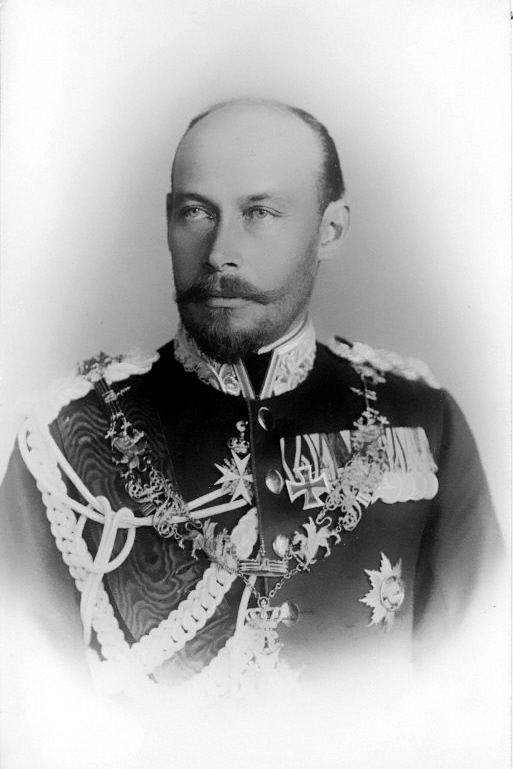
- Frederick Francis III c. 1883–1897

Grand Duke of Mecklenburg-Schwerin
- Reign: 15 April 1883 – 10 April 1897
- Predecessor: Frederick Francis II
- Successor: Frederick Francis IV
- Born: 19 March 1851; Ludwigslust Palace, Mecklenburg-Schwerin, German Confederation
- Died: 10 April 1897 (aged 46); Cannes, France
- Spouse: Grand Duchess Anastasia Mikhailovna of Russia (m. 1879)
- Issue: Alexandrine, Queen of Denmark; Frederick Francis IV; Cecilie, German Crown Princess
- House: Mecklenburg-Schwerin
- Father: Frederick Francis II
- Mother: Princess Augusta Reuss of Köstritz
- Religion: Lutheranism

Frederick Francis III (German: Friedrich Franz Paul Nikolaus Ernst Heinrich; 19 March 1851 – 10 April 1897) was the penultimate Grand Duke of Mecklenburg-Schwerin.

== Biography ==
Frederick Francis was born in Schloss Ludwigslust as the son of Frederick Francis II, Grand Duke of Mecklenburg-Schwerin, and his first wife Princess Augusta Reuss of Köstritz. He succeeded his father as Grand Duke on 15 April 1883.

From an early age Frederick Francis suffered from asthma and severe breathing difficulties. He could not live all year round in the north of Europe and for much of the year lived on the shores of the Mediterranean, where the mild climate agreed with him. His homosexuality was an open secret.

Frederick Francis's death in Cannes on 10 April 1897 is shrouded in mystery. Soon after his death, the New York Times reported that he had died after throwing himself off the parapet of a bridge; but the official account of his death said that he was in his garden when he experienced breathing difficulties and staggered around before falling over a low wall. Baroness Louise von Reibnitz-Maltzan, a lady-in-waiting who was in Cannes with the family at the time of his death, described the incident as "the Grand Duke's suicide".

He was succeeded by his son Frederick Francis IV, who would be the last Grand Duke of Mecklenburg-Schwerin.

== Marriage and children ==
Frederick Francis married Grand Duchess Anastasia Mikhailovna of Russia, his second cousin once removed, he being the great-great-grandson and she great-granddaughter of Paul I of Russia. They were also second cousins because they were great-grandchildren of Louise of Mecklenburg-Strelitz. They married in Saint Petersburg on 24 January 1879. They had three children:

- Duchess Alexandrine of Mecklenburg-Schwerin (24 December 1879 – 28 December 1952) she married King Christian X of Denmark on 26 April 1898. They had two sons.
- Frederick Francis IV, Grand Duke of Mecklenburg-Schwerin (9 April 1882 – 17 November 1945) he married Princess Alexandra of Hanover and Cumberland on 7 June 1904. They had five children.
- Duchess Cecilie of Mecklenburg-Schwerin (20 September 1886 – 6 May 1954) she married Wilhelm, German Crown Prince on 6 June 1905. They had six children.

== Legacy ==
He was described by his daughter Cecilie in her 1952 memoirs:

His whole soul was bound up with his country of Mecklenburg, and it was infinitely painful for him, as its ruling prince, to have to spend several months each year away from his country on account of his health. [...] When I call to mind what my father looked like, I see before me the most lovable and kindly being that has ever existed. He was tall and slim in build, with beautiful gleaming eyes whom which his warm heart shone forth- that is my unforgettable impression of my father. Nothing could bring me greater pleasure later on than when people who had known him well have told me that I look like him. He had to suffer infinitely much, but never did a word of complaint pass his lips.

== Honours ==
He received the following orders and decorations: German honours

- Mecklenburg:
  - Grand Cross of the Wendish Crown, with Crown in Ore and Collar
  - Founder of the Order of the Griffon, 15 September 1884
  - Memorial Medal for Grand Duke Frederick Francis II
  - Cross for Distinction in War (Strelitz)
- Baden:
  - Knight of the House Order of Fidelity, 1879
  - Knight of the Order of Berthold the First, 1879
- (Saxe-Coburg and Gotha) (Duchy of Saxe-Altenburg) (Saxe-Meiningen) Ernestine duchies: Grand Cross of the Saxe-Ernestine House Order, with Swords and Collar
- Oldenburg: Grand Cross of the Order of Duke Peter Friedrich Ludwig, with Collar and Golden Crown, 19 September 1872
- Prussia:
  - Knight of the Black Eagle, 26 September 1869; with Collar, 1873
  - Grand Cross of the Red Eagle
  - Iron Cross (1870), 2nd Class
  - Knight of Honour of the Johanniter Order, 1873; Knight of Justice, 1874
- Hohenzollern: Cross of Honour of the Princely House Order of Hohenzollern, 1st Class
- Hesse-Darmstadt: Grand Cross of the Ludwig Order, 12 October 1864
- Reuss: Cross of Honour
- Saxe-Weimar-Eisenach: Grand Cross of the White Falcon, 1874
- Saxony: Knight of the Rue Crown
- Württemberg: Grand Cross of the Württemberg Crown, 1877

Foreign honours

- (Austrian Empire) (Kingdom of Hungary) Austria-Hungary: Grand Cross of the Royal Hungarian Order of St. Stephen, 1894
- Principality of Bulgaria: Grand Cross of St. Alexander
- Denmark: Knight of the Elephant, 17 July 1894
- Kingdom of Greece: Grand Cross of the Redeemer
- Kingdom of Italy:
  - Knight of the Annunciation, 18 May 1894
  - Grand Cross of Saints Maurice and Lazarus
- Empire of Japan: Grand Cordon of the Order of the Chrysanthemum, 5 June 1885
- Ottoman Empire:
  - Order of Osmanieh, 1st Class in Diamonds
  - Gold and Silver Imtiyaz Medals
- Beylik of Tunis: Grand Cordon of the Order of Glory
- Kingdom of Portugal: Grand Cross of the Tower and Sword, with Collar
- (Thailand) Siam: Grand Cross of the White Elephant
- Kingdom of Serbia: Grand Cross of the White Eagle
- Sweden-Norway: Knight of the Seraphim, 22 April 1896
- Russian Empire:
  - Knight of St. Andrew
  - Knight of St. Alexander Nevsky
  - Knight of the White Eagle
  - Knight of St. Anna, 1st Class
  - Knight of St. George, 4th Class

== Ancestry ==
Ancestors of Frederick Francis III

8. Frederick Louis, Hereditary Grand Duke of Mecklenburg-Schwerin
4. Paul Frederick, Grand Duke of Mecklenburg-Schwerin
9. Grand Duchess Elena Pavlovna of Russia
2. Frederick Francis II, Grand Duke of Mecklenburg-Schwerin
10. Frederick William III of Prussia
5. Princess Alexandrine of Prussia
11. Duchess Louise of Mecklenburg-Strelitz
1. Frederick Francis III, Grand Duke of Mecklenburg-Schwerin
12. Heinrich XLIV, Prince Reuss of Köstritz
6. Heinrich LXIII, Prince Reuss of Köstritz
13. Baroness Wilhelmine von Geuder genannt Rabensteiner
3. Princess Augusta Reuss of Köstritz
14. Count Heinrich of Stolberg-Wernigerode
7. Countess Eleonore of Stolberg-Wernigerode
15. Princess Johanna of Schönburg-Waldenburg

== Literature ==
- Bernd-Ulrich Hergemöller, Mann für Mann, pages 253
- Hans von Tresckow, Von Fürsten und anderen Sterblichen, Erinnerungen eines Kriminalkommisars, 1922, Berlin, page 89

Frederick Francis III House of Mecklenburg-Schwerin Cadet branch of the House of Mecklenburg Born: 19 March 1851 Died: 10 April 1897
Regnal titles
Preceded by Frederick Francis II	Grand Duke of Mecklenburg-Schwerin; 1883–1897	Succeeded by Frederick Francis IV
