= Ernest Augustus, Crown Prince of Hanover =

Last crown prince of Hanover

Ernest Augustus
- Crown Prince of Hanover; Duke of Cumberland and Teviotdale
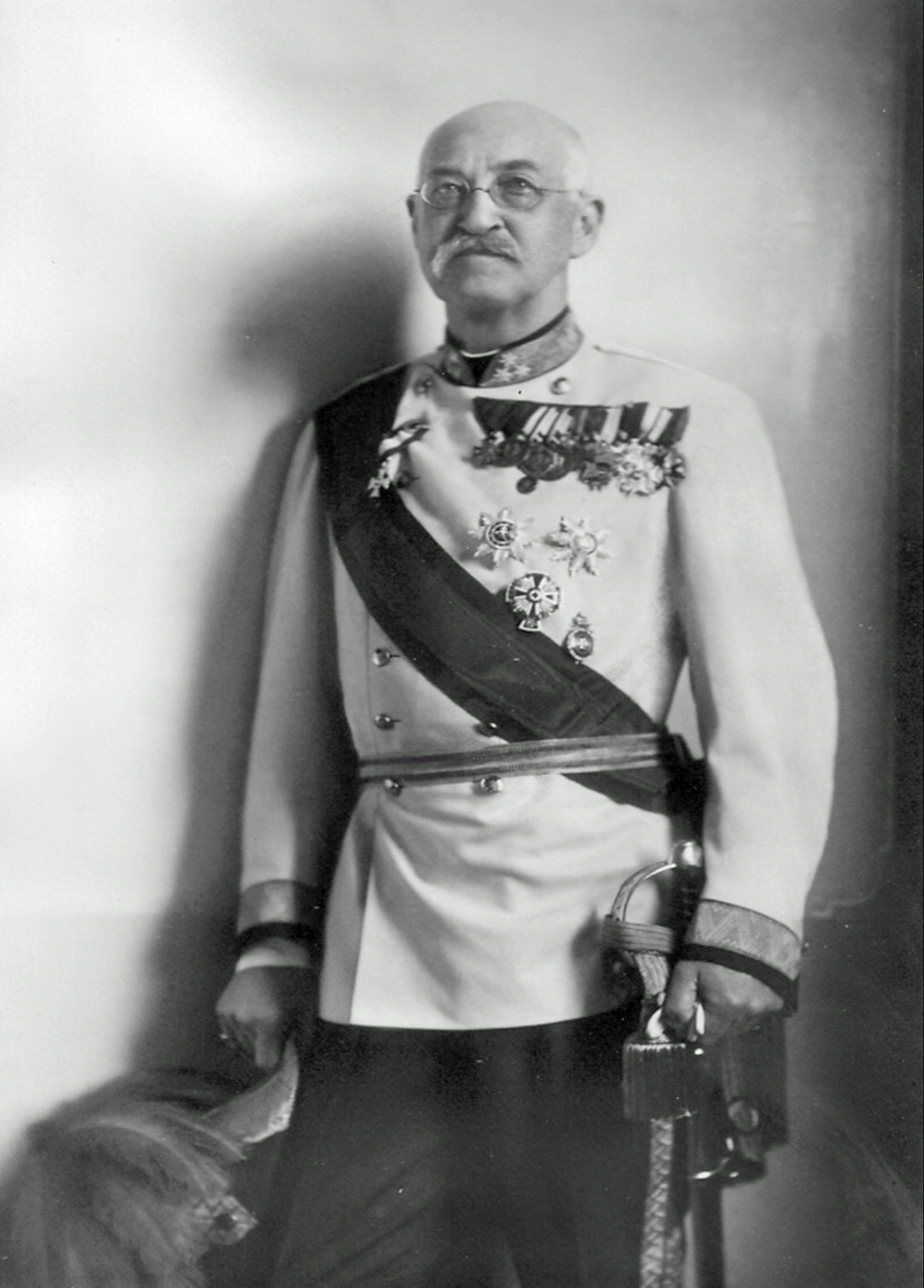
- Ernest Augustus in 1900

Head of the House of Hanover
- Pretence: 12 June 1878 – 14 November 1923
- Predecessor: George V
- Successor: Ernest Augustus, Duke of Brunswick
- Born: 21 September 1845; Hanover, Kingdom of Hanover
- Died: 14 November 1923 (aged 78); Gmunden, First Austrian Republic
- Burial: Gmunden
- Spouse: Princess Thyra of Denmark (m. 1878)
- Issue: Marie Louise, Margravine of Baden; George William, Hereditary Prince of Hanover; Alexandra, Grand Duchess of Mecklenburg-Schwerin; Princess Olga; Prince Christian; Ernest Augustus, Duke of Brunswick
Names
- German: Ernst August Wilhelm Adolf Georg Friedrich; English: Ernest Augustus William Adolphus George Frederick
- House: Hanover
- Father: George V of Hanover
- Mother: Marie of Saxe-Altenburg

Ernest Augustus, Crown Prince of Hanover (German: Ernst August; 21 September 1845 – 14 November 1923), was the eldest child and only son of George V of Hanover and his wife, Marie of Saxe-Altenburg. Ernest Augustus was deprived of the throne of Hanover upon its annexation by Prussia in 1866 and later the Duchy of Brunswick in 1884. He was also deprived of his British peerages (including Duke of Cumberland and Teviotdale) and honours for having sided with Germany in World War I.

== Early life ==
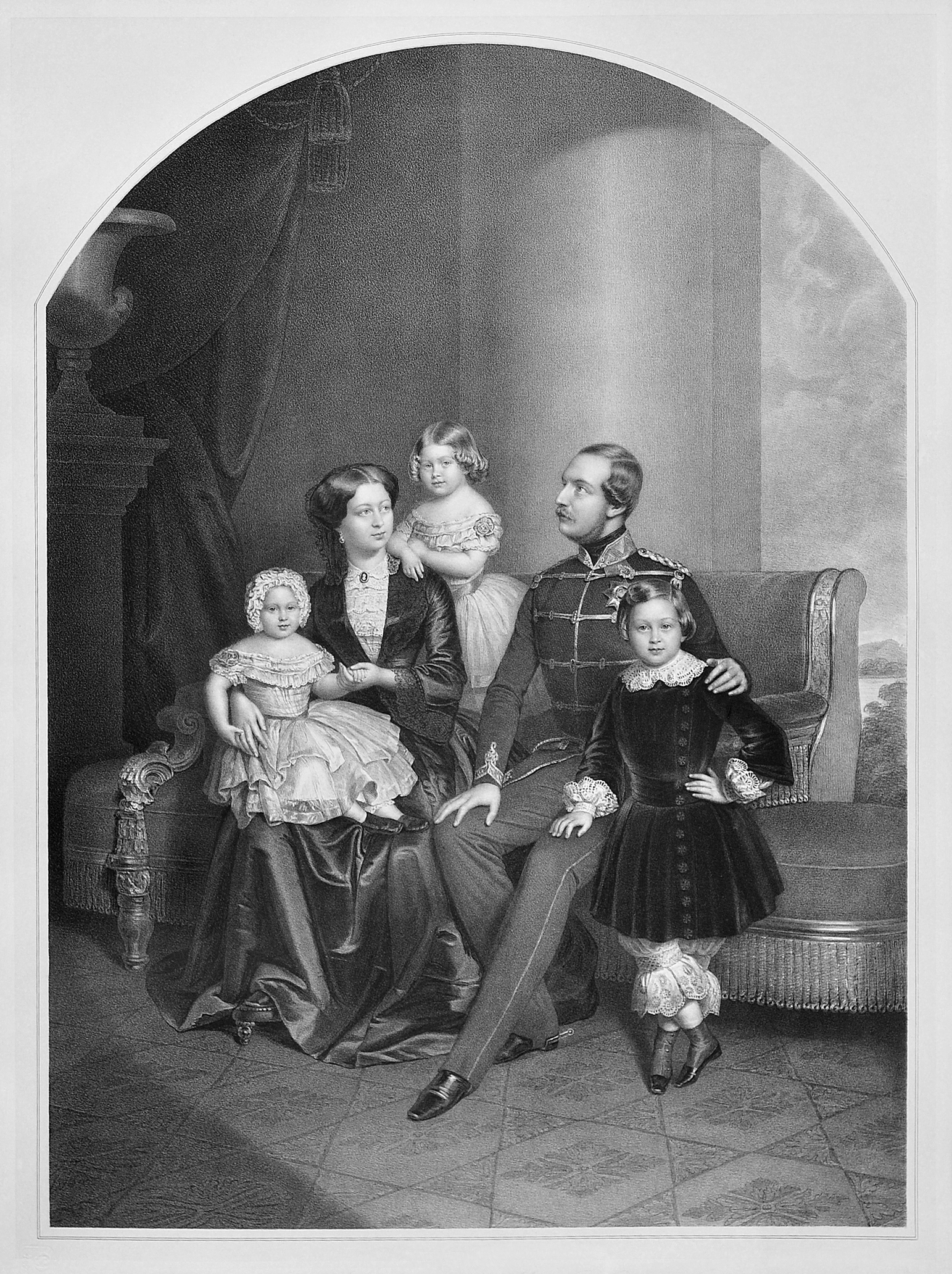
King George V and Queen Marie of Hanover and their children Ernest Augustus, Frederica and Marie in 1855

Prince Ernest Augustus of Hanover, Duke of Brunswick-Lüneburg, Prince of Great Britain and Ireland, was born on 21 September 1845 during the reign of his paternal grandfather, Ernest Augustus, King of Hanover. He was the only son of Crown Prince George of Hanover and Princess Marie of Saxe-Altenburg, and was born at the Fürstenhof in Hanover, the residence of the Crown Prince at the time. Since his father was totally blind, there were doubts as to whether the Crown Prince was qualified to succeed as king of Hanover, but King Ernest August decided that he should do so. Upon his father's accession as George V in November 1851, Ernest Augustus became the crown prince of Hanover.

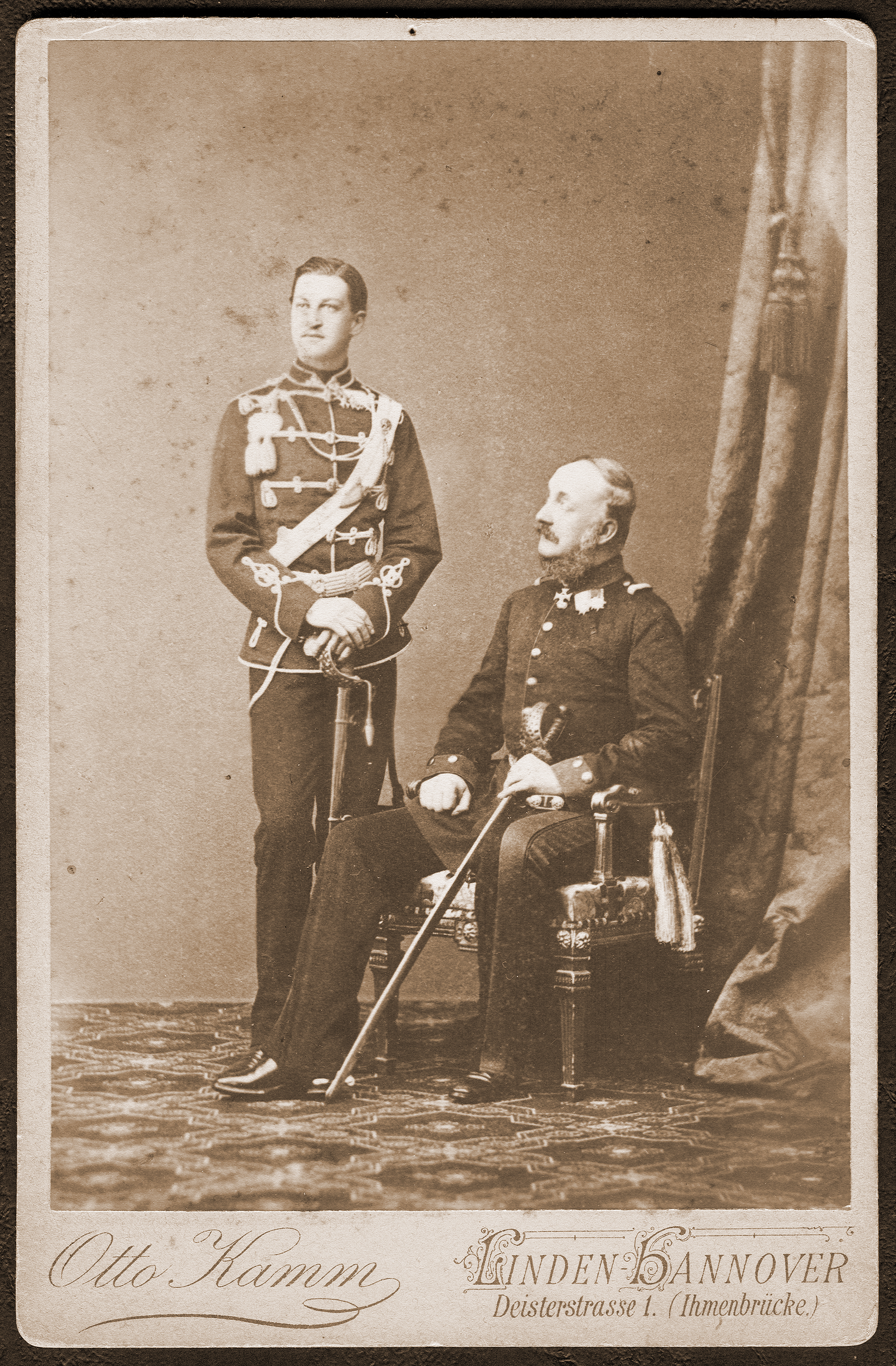
The young crown prince with his blind father in Hanover in the 1860s

In 1866, William I of Prussia and his minister-president Otto von Bismarck deposed George V and annexed Hanover after George V sided with the defeated Austria in the 1866 Austro-Prussian War. During that war, the Crown Prince saw action at the Battle of Langensalza.

== Exile ==
After the war, the exiled Hanoverian royal family took up residence in Hietzing, near Vienna, but spent a good deal of time in Paris. George V never abandoned his claim to the Hanoverian throne and maintained the Guelphic Legion at his own expense. The former Crown Prince travelled during this early period of exile, and ultimately accepted a commission in the Imperial and Royal Army of Austria-Hungary. The Guelph Party, or the German-Hanoverian Party, as a minor party in the legislature of the North German Federation and then the German Empire continued to protest the annexation of Hanover and advocated for the restoration of the state of Hanover with a Guelph at its head.

== Succession ==
When King George V died in Paris on 12 June 1878, Prince Ernest Augustus succeeded to his father's claim to the throne of Hanover, which he maintained until 1913. Emperor Franz Joseph I of Austria appointed him to succeed his father as colonel and proprietor of the Austrian 42nd Regiment of Infantry. The regiment's name was changed to honour him, and he served as its honorary colonel from 1879 to the fall of the Austro-Hungarian Empire, in 1918. Ernest Augustus also succeeded his father as Duke of Cumberland and Teviotdale in the Peerage of Great Britain and Earl of Armagh in the Peerage of Ireland. Queen Victoria created him a Knight of the Garter on 20 July 1878.

== Marriage ==
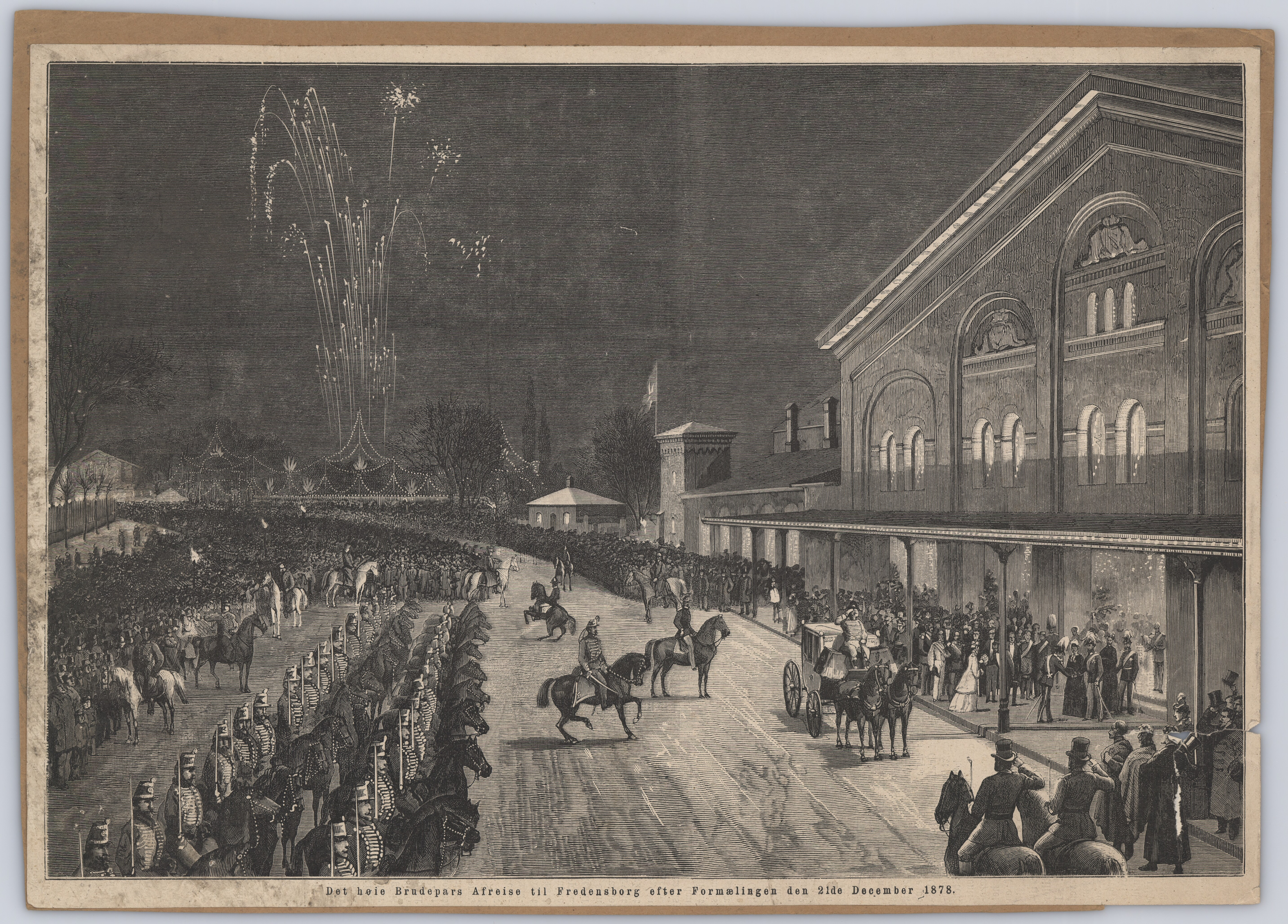
The newlyweds depart Copenhagen Central Station after the wedding in 1878.

While visiting his second cousin Albert Edward, Prince of Wales (later King Edward VII) at Sandringham in 1875, he met Princess Thyra of Denmark (29 September 1853 – 26 February 1933), the youngest daughter of King Christian IX and a sister of the Princess of Wales (later Queen Alexandra).

On 21/22 December 1878, he and Princess Thyra married at Christiansborg Palace in Copenhagen.

== Duchy of Brunswick ==
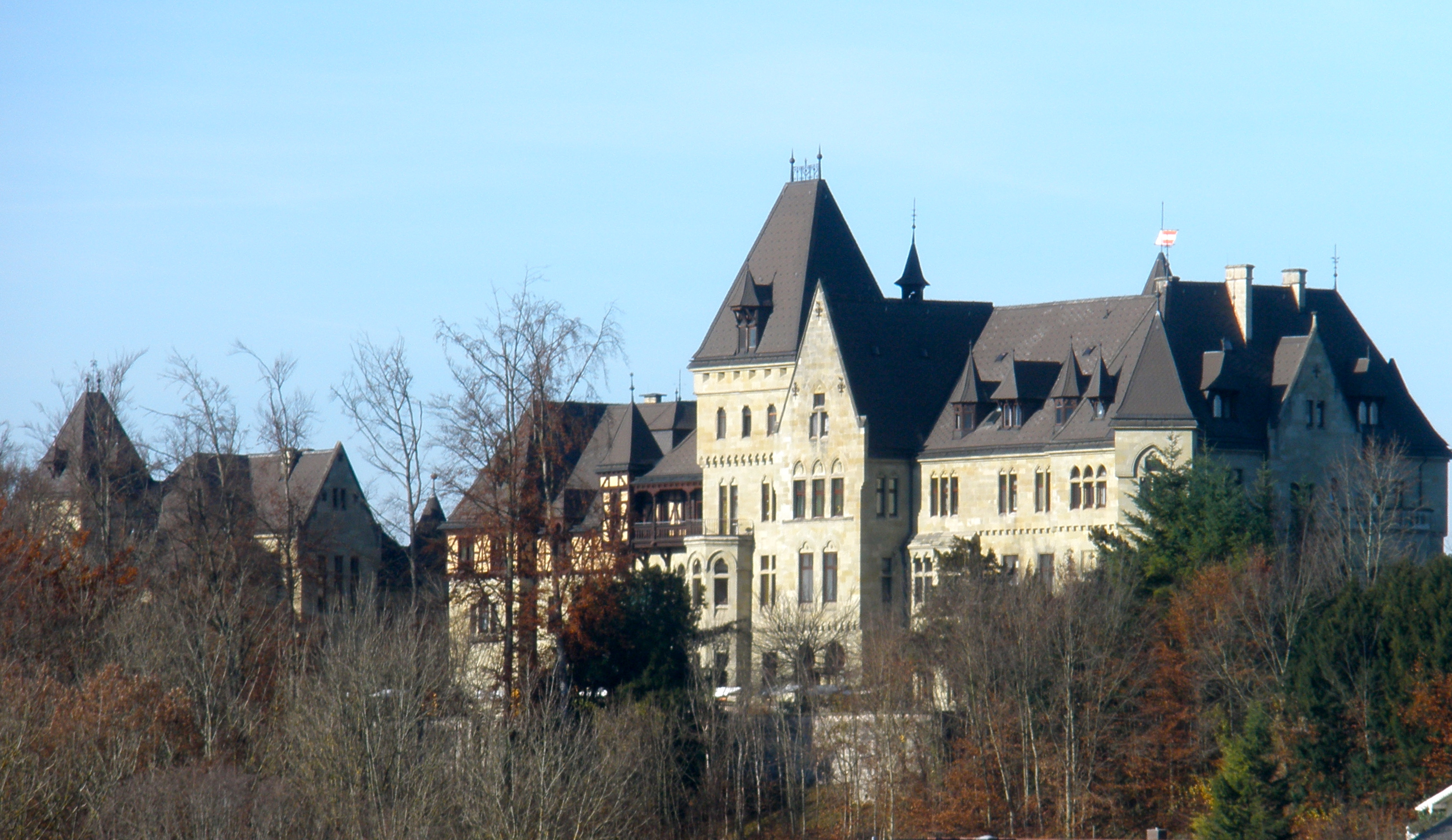
Schloss Cumberland in Gmunden, Austria, built in 1882 as exile seat for Ernest Augustus, Crown Prince of Hanover, 3rd Duke of Cumberland and Teviotdale

Queen Victoria appointed Ernest Augustus a colonel in the British Army in 1876 and promoted him to major general in 1886, lieutenant general in 1892 and general in 1898. Despite his British peerage and royal title, Ernest Augustus was a German noble who considered himself an exiled monarch of a German realm and refused to disclaim his succession rights to Hanover, making his home in Gmunden, Upper Austria.

Ernest Augustus was also first in the line of succession to the Duchy of Brunswick after his distant cousin, Duke William. In 1879, when it became apparent that the senior line of the House of Welf would die with William, the Brunswick parliament created a council of regency to take over administration of the duchy upon William's death. This council would appoint a regent if he could not ascend the throne. When William died in 1884, Ernest Augustus proclaimed himself Duke of Brunswick. However, since he still claimed to be the legitimate King of Hanover as well, the German Bundesrat declared that he would disturb the peace of the empire if he ascended the ducal throne. Under Prussian pressure, the council of regency ignored his claim and appointed Prince Albert of Prussia as regent.

Negotiations between Ernest Augustus and the German government continued for almost three decades, to no avail. During this time, Regent Albert died and Duke John Albert of Mecklenburg was appointed as regent.

== Reconciliation ==
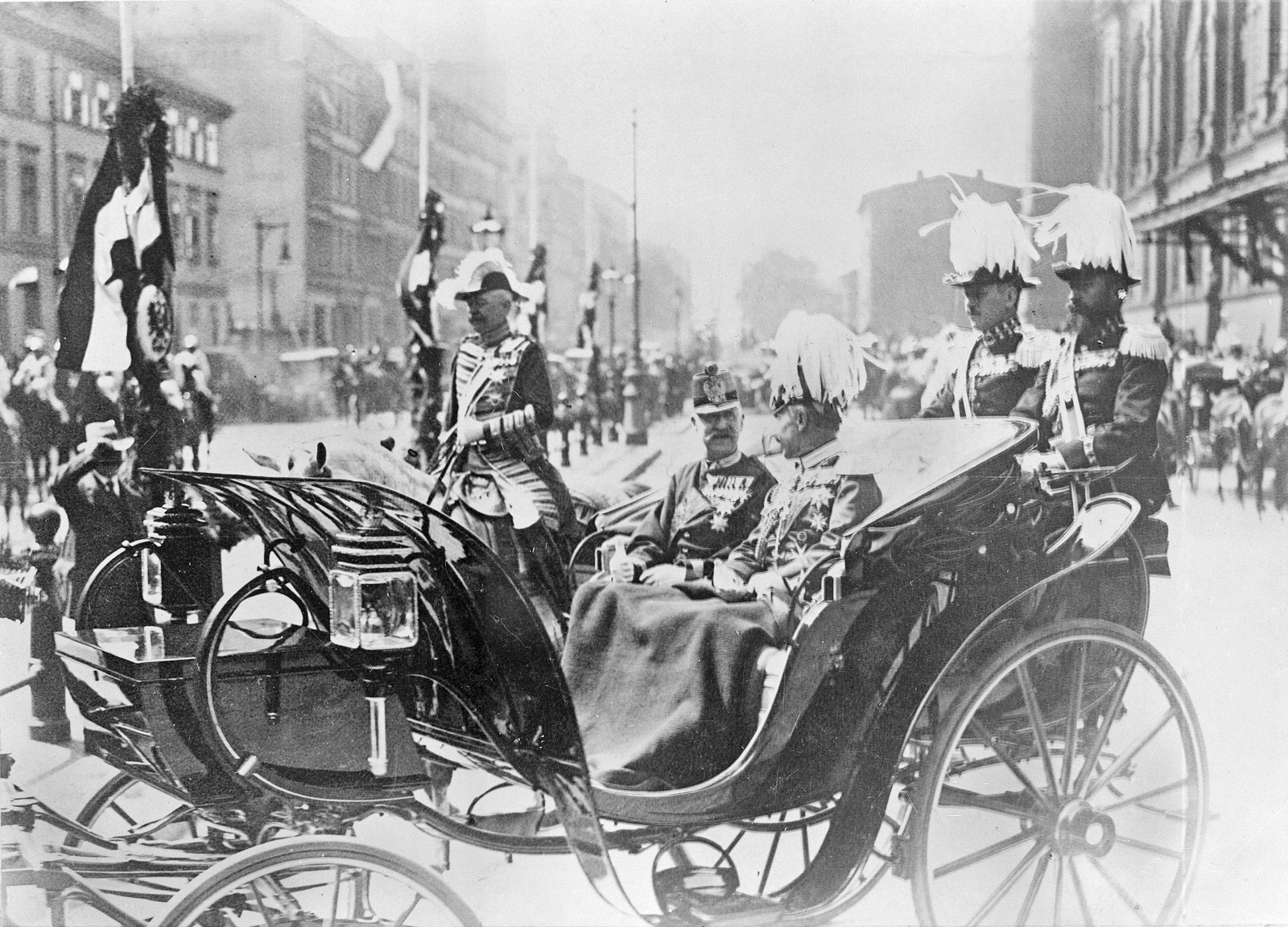
In a carriage with Kaiser Wilhelm II at the wedding of Princess Victoria Louise of Prussia and Ernest Augustus, Duke of Brunswick, on 24 May 1913

Ernest Augustus was partially reconciled with the Hohenzollern dynasty in 1913, when his surviving son, Ernest Augustus, married Victoria Louise, the only daughter of Kaiser Wilhelm II, the grandson of the Prussian king who had deposed his father. On 24 October 1913, he renounced his succession rights to the Brunswick duchy (which had belonged to the Guelph dynasty since 1235) in favour of his son. The younger Ernest Augustus thus became the reigning Duke of Brunswick on 1 November 1913 and married the Kaiser's daughter. As a mark of regard for his daughter's father-in-law, Kaiser Wilhelm II created the elder Ernest Augustus a Knight of the Order of the Black Eagle.

In 1918, the younger Duke Ernest Augustus abdicated his throne along with the other German princes when all the German dynasties were disestablished by the successor German provisional Government which was established when the Emperor himself abdicated and fled Germany in exile to the Netherlands.

== War ==
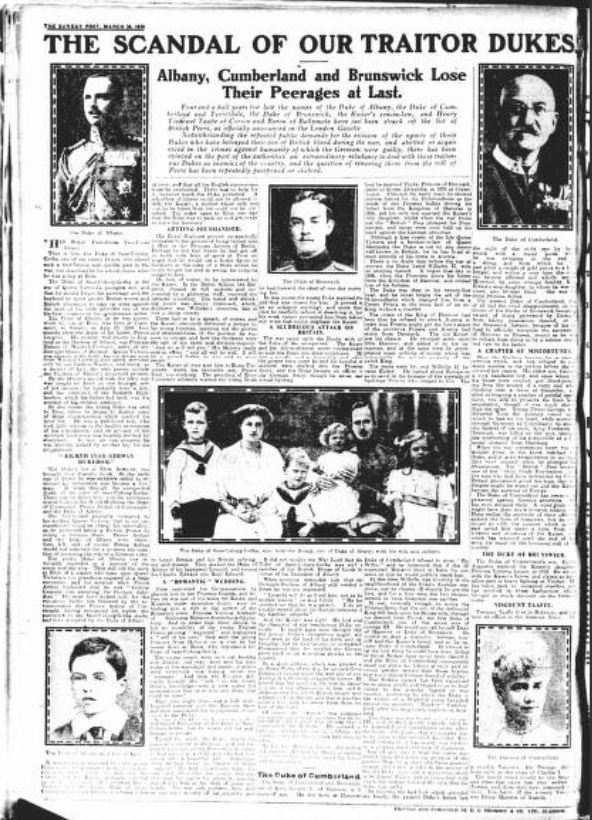
Article in The Sunday Post discussing a number of royals, including Ernest Augustus, losing their titles under the Titles Deprivation Act 1917 (1919)

The outbreak of World War I created a breach between the British royal family and its Hanoverian cousins. On 13 May 1915, King George V ordered the removal of the Duke of Cumberland from the Roll of the Order of the Garter. According to the letters patent on 30 November 1917, he lost the status of a British prince and the style of Highness. Under the terms of the Titles Deprivation Act 1917, on 28 March 1919 his name was removed from the roll of Peers of Great Britain and of Ireland by Order of the King in Council for "bearing arms against Great Britain."

== Later life ==
Prince Ernest Augustus, the former Crown Prince of Hanover and former Duke of Cumberland, died of a stroke on his estate at Gmunden in November 1923. He is interred, next to his wife and his mother, in a mausoleum which he had built adjacent to Cumberland Castle.

== Honours and arms ==
=== Orders and decorations ===
- Hanover:
  - Grand Cross of the Royal Guelphic Order, 1862
  - Knight of St. George, 1862
  - Grand Cross of the Order of Ernst August, ca. 1865
  - Langensalza Medal, 27 July 1866 – as a veteran of the battle
- United Kingdom: Knight of the Garter, 20 July 1878
- Brunswick:
  - Grand Cross of the Order of Henry the Lion, 1862
  - War Merit Cross, 2nd Class, ca. 1914
- Oldenburg: Grand Cross of the Order of Duke Peter Friedrich Ludwig, with Golden Crown, 14 April 1862
- (Saxe-Coburg and Gotha) (Duchy of Saxe-Altenburg) (Saxe-Meiningen) Ernestine duchies: Grand Cross of the Saxe-Ernestine House Order, October 1862
- Nassau: Knight of the Gold Lion of Nassau, September 1863
- Russia: Knight of St. Andrew, 1864
- Mecklenburg: Grand Cross of the Wendish Crown, with Crown in Ore, 29 October 1865
- Saxony: Knight of the Rue Crown, 1866
- Austria:
  - Knight of the Military Order of Maria Theresa, 1866
  - Grand Cross of the Royal Hungarian Order of St. Stephen, 1892
  - Jubilee Court Medal of 1898 (on the 50th anniversary of Franz Joseph I's reign)
  - Jubilee Cross of 1908 (on the 60th anniversary of Franz Joseph I's reign)
  - Mobilization Cross of 1912/13
  - Star of the Decoration for Services to the Red Cross, ca. 1914-1918
  - Long Service Cross for Officers (for 40 years of service)
- Hesse-Kassel: Knight of the Golden Lion, 1 November 1869
- Denmark:
  - Knight of the Elephant, 16 November 1878
  - Cross of Honour of the Order of the Dannebrog, 21 December 1878
  - Commemorative Medal for the Golden Wedding of King Christian IX and Queen Louise, 1892
  - King Christian IX Centenary Medal, 1918
- (Grand Duchy of Hesse) Hesse-Darmstadt: Grand Cross of the Merit Order of Philip the Magnanimous
- Bavaria: Knight of St. Hubert, 1899
- Baden: Knight of the House Order of Fidelity, 1900
- Spain: Knight of the Golden Fleece, 9 July 1902
- Prussia: Knight of the Black Eagle, November 1913

=== Military appointments ===
In Germany:

- (Kingdom of Hanover) 1863 (ca.): Leutnant, Royal Hanoverian Garde-Husaren-Regiment
- (Kingdom of Bavaria) 9 December 1912 (ca.): Generalmajor à la Suite, Royal Bavarian Schweren Reiter-Regiment "Prinz Karl von Bayern" Nr. 1

In Austria:

- (Austria-Hungary) 1879: Oberstinhaber (Colonel and Proprietor), K.u.K. Infanterieregiment "Ernst August, Herzog von Cumberland und Herzog zu Braunschweig-Lüneburg" Nr. 42
- (Austria-Hungary) 1914 (ca.): Generalmajor, K.u.K. Armee
- (Austria-Hungary) 1914-1918 (ca.): General der Kavallerie, K.u.K. Armee

In the United Kingdom:

- (United Kingdom) 27 May 1876: Colonel, British Army
- (United Kingdom) 19 March 1886: Major General, British Army
- (United Kingdom) 1 April 1892: Lieutenant General, British Army
- (United Kingdom) 14 December 1898: General, British Army

=== Arms ===
Arms in Spain after 1902

Until his father's death in 1878, Ernest Augustus's arms in right of the United Kingdom were those of his father (being the arms of the Kingdom of Hanover differenced by a label gules bearing a horse courant argent). Upon his father's death, he inherited his arms.

== Issue ==
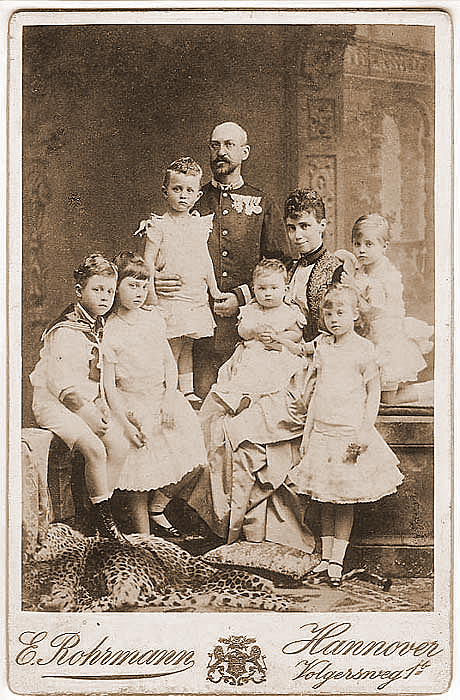
Ernest Augustus with family, photographed by Karl Jagerspacher, 1887

The Duke and Duchess of Cumberland and Teviotdale had six children:

Name	Birth	Death	Notes
Princess Marie Louise of Hanover and Cumberland (Marie Louise Victoria Caroline Amalie Alexandra Augusta Friederike)	11 October 1879	31 January 1948	married in 1900 Maximilian, Margrave of Baden (10 July 1867 – 6 November 1929); had issue
George William, Hereditary Prince of Hanover (Georg Wilhelm Christian Albert Edward Alexander Friedrich Waldemar Ernst Adolf)	28 October 1880	20 May 1912	died in an automobile accident, never married or had issue.
Princess Alexandra of Hanover and Cumberland (Alexandra Louise Marie Olga Elisabeth Therese Vera)	29 September 1882	30 August 1963	married in 1904 Friedrich Franz IV, Grand Duke of Mecklenburg-Schwerin (9 April 1882 – 17 November 1945); had issue
Princess Olga of Hanover and Cumberland (Olga Adelaide Louise Mary Alexandrina Agnes)	11 July 1884	21 September 1958	never married or had issue
Prince Christian of Hanover and Cumberland (Christian Friedrich Wilhelm Georg Peter Valdemar)	4 July 1885	3 September 1901	never married or had issue
Ernest Augustus, Duke of Brunswick	17 November 1887	30 January 1953	married in 1913 Princess Viktoria Luise of Prussia (13 September 1892 – 11 December 1980); had issue

== Ancestry ==
Ancestors of Ernest Augustus, Crown Prince of Hanover

8. George III of the United Kingdom
4. Ernest Augustus, King of Hanover
9. Duchess Charlotte of Mecklenburg-Strelitz
2. George V of Hanover
10. Charles II, Grand Duke of Mecklenburg-Strelitz
5. Duchess Frederica of Mecklenburg-Strelitz
11. Princess Friederike of Hesse-Darmstadt
1. Ernest Augustus, Crown Prince of Hanover
12. Frederick, Duke of Saxe-Altenburg
6. Joseph, Duke of Saxe-Altenburg
13. Duchess Charlotte Georgine of Mecklenburg-Strelitz
3. Princess Marie of Saxe-Altenburg
14. Duke Louis of Württemberg
7. Duchess Amelia of Württemberg
15. Princess Henriette of Nassau-Weilburg

== Notes ==
Ernest Augustus, Crown Prince of Hanover House of Hanover Cadet branch of the House of Welf Born: 21 September 1845 Died: 14 November 1923
Peerage of Great Britain
Preceded by George	Duke of Cumberland and Teviotdale; 12 June 1878 – 28 March 1919	Suspended Titles Deprivation Act 1917
Peerage of Ireland
Preceded by George	Earl of Armagh; 12 June 1878 – 28 March 1919	Suspended Titles Deprivation Act 1917
Titles in pretence
Loss of title Deprivation	— TITULAR — Duke of Cumberland and Teviotdale; 28 March 1919 – 14 November 1923	Succeeded by Ernest Augustus, Duke of Brunswick
Preceded by George V	— TITULAR — King of Hanover; 12 June 1878 – 14 November 1923; Reason for succession failure: Hanover annexed by Prussia in 1866	Succeeded by Ernest Augustus, Duke of Brunswick
Preceded by William	— TITULAR — Duke of Brunswick-Wolfenbüttel; 18 October 1884 – 1 November 1913; Reason for succession failure: Refused to give up claim to Hanover	Succeeded by Ernest Augustus, Duke of Brunswick
