= Order of Ernst August =

Order of Ernst Augustus
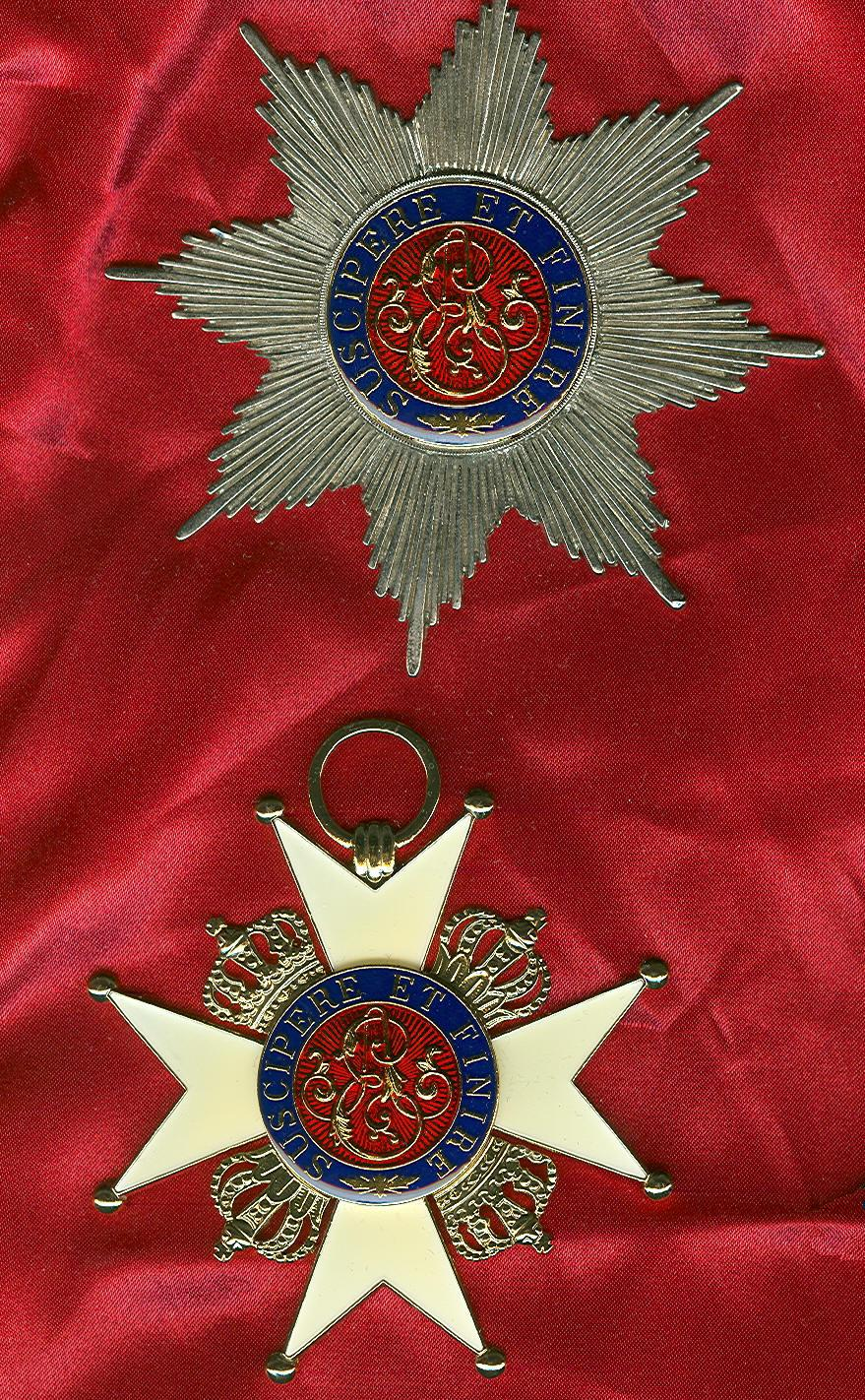
- Insignia of Knight Grand Cross of the Order of Ernst August

Awarded by Kingdom of Hannover
- Type: Knightly State Order
- Motto: SUSCIPERE ET FINIRE
- Awarded for: Civil and military merit
- Status: Dissolved as a state order, given as a House Order
- Grand Master: Ernst August, Prince of Hanover
- Grades: Grand Cross; Grand Commander; Commander; Officer; Knight

Precedence
- Next (higher): Royal Guelphic Order
- Next (lower): -
- Ribbon of the order

The Order of Ernst August (German: Ernst-August-Orden) was founded 15 December 1865 by King George V of Hanover in memory of his father Ernest Augustus, King of Hanover. The order was awarded for both civil and military merit. It was divided in five classes:

- Grand Cross
- Grand Commander
- Commander
- Officer
- Knight

== History ==
In 1866, the Kingdom of Hanover was defeated and annexed by the Kingdom of Prussia at the end of the Austro-Prussian War. As a result, Prussia dissolved the three Hanoverian orders of knighthood. George V and his successors still continued to award the Order of Ernst August, but now as a House Order, in the same manner of many non-regnant royal houses. Between 1865 and 1900, forty-two Grand Crosses were granted (most, after the royal family's expulsion from Hanover in 1866); seventeen Hanoverian and twenty-five foreign Grand Crosses are recorded.

== Insignia ==
The medal is a gold Maltese cross, enamelled white, with small gold ball on eight points and four royal crowns in the corners. At the center is a medallion of red enamel with the monogram of Ernest Augustus (EA), and around, there was a band of blue enamel with the motto of the order "SUSCIPERE ET FINIRE" in gold. The back displays the founding date "DEC MDCCCLXV XV" with the initials of the king who had granted the order George V ("G").

The ribbon is scarlet red with two dark blue stripes parallel to each side.
