= Prince Sigismund of Prussia (born 1896) =

German royal

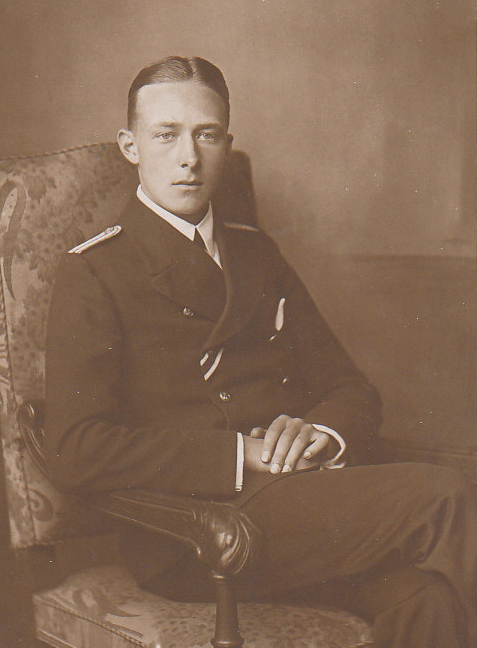
- Sigismund in 1918
- Born: 27 November 1896; Kiel, Province of Schleswig-Holstein, German Empire
- Died: 14 November 1978 (aged 81); Puntarenas, Costa Rica
- Burial: 21 November 1978; Esparza, Costa Rica
- Spouse: Princess Charlotte of Saxe-Altenburg (m. 1919)
- Issue Detail: Princess Barbara; Prince Alfred
Names
- German: Wilhelm Viktor Karl August Heinrich Sigismund; English: William Victor Charles Augustus Henry Sigismund
- House: Hohenzollern
- Father: Prince Henry of Prussia
- Mother: Princess Irene of Hesse and by Rhine

Prince William Victor Charles Augustus Henry Sigismund of Prussia (German: Wilhelm Viktor Karl August Heinrich Sigismund; 27 November 1896 at Kiel – 14 November 1978 at Puntarenas, Costa Rica), was the second son of Prince Henry of Prussia and Princess Irene of Hesse and by Rhine. He was the nephew of Kaiser Wilhelm II and Tsarina Alexandra of Russia. As the great-grandson of Queen Victoria through both his parents, he was the only one of three brothers who did not have the hemophilia common among her descendants.

== Life ==
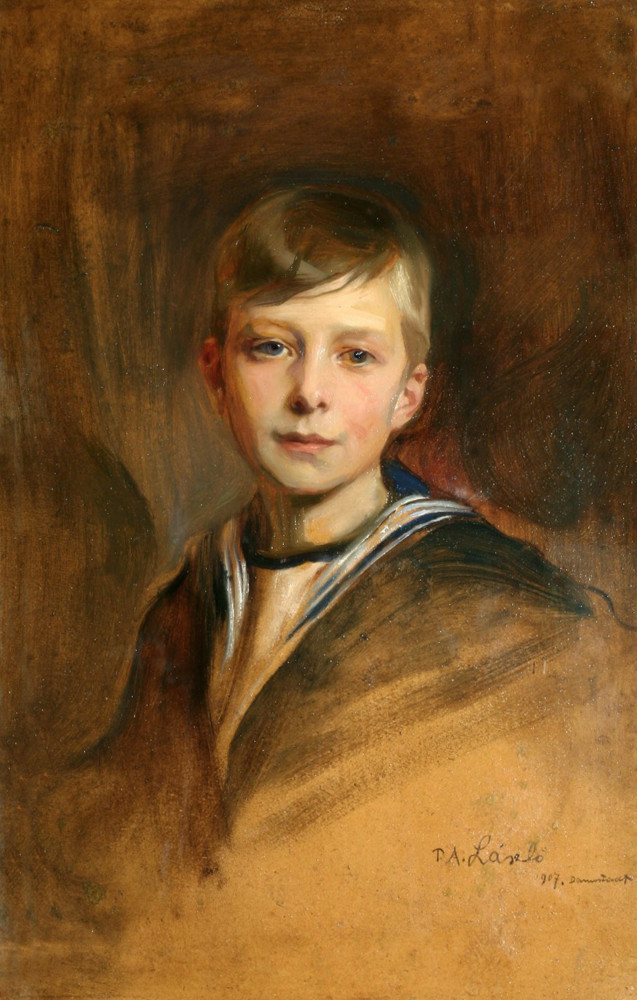
Portrait of Sigismund by Philip de László, 1907

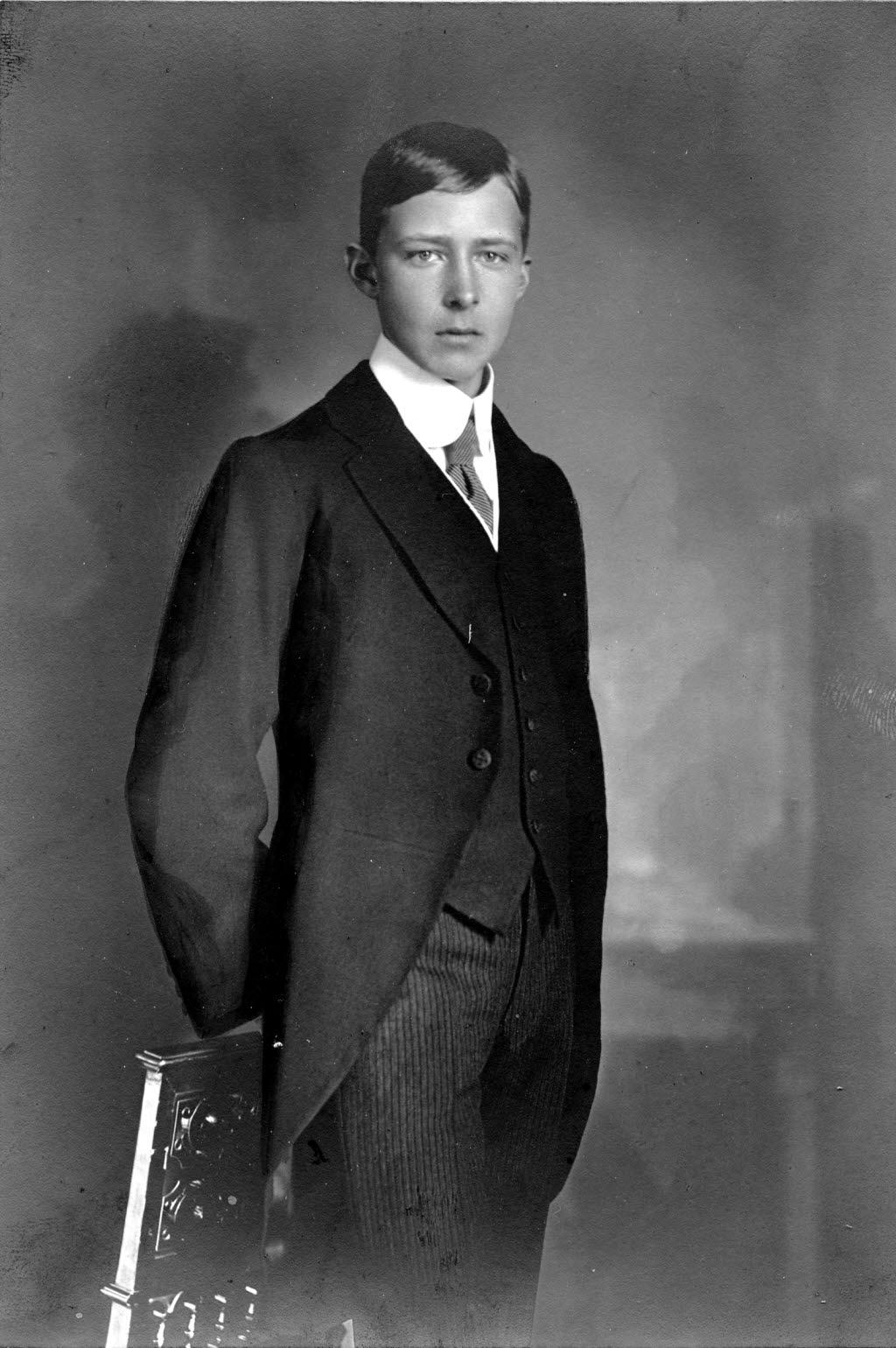
Sigismund in 1913

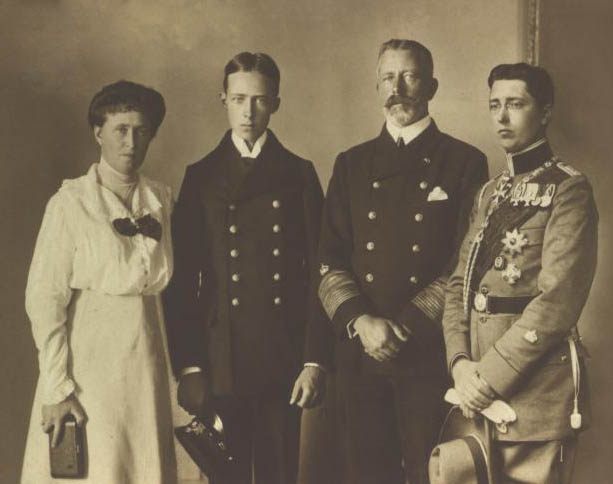
Sigismund (second from left) with his elder brother Waldemar and their parents, Henry and Irene, c. 1920

=== Marriage and issue ===
On 11 July 1919 at Hemmelmark, he married Princess Charlotte of Saxe-Altenburg (4 March 1899 – 16 February 1989), the eldest daughter of Ernst II, Duke of Saxe-Altenburg. They had two children:

- Barbara Irene Adelheid Viktoria Elisabeth Bathildis (2 August 1920 – 31 May 1994), married in 1954 Duke Christian Louis of Mecklenburg, with issue, including Donata Mecklenburg-Solodkoff.
- Alfred Friedrich Ernst Heinrich Conrad (17 August 1924 – 3 June 2013), married in 1984 Maritza Farkas de Zaladörgicse et Kiskapornok (6 August 1929, Gombaszog, Košice Region, Czechoslovakia – 1 November 1996), without issue.

=== Costa Rica ===
Prior to emigrating from Europe to Central America, he served as a marine officer.

In 1927, Sigismund and his family resettled in Costa Rica three years after his son Alfred (1924–2013) had been born in Guatemala. He planned to engage in banana and coffee planting on land he owned there.

In 1957, Sigismund returned to Germany to meet with Anna Anderson whom he recognized as his cousin Grand Duchess Anastasia. During this visit he also met and acknowledged Marga Boodts who claimed to be Grand Duchess Olga Nikolaevna of Russia and Ceclava Czapska who claimed to be Grand Duchess Maria Nikolaevna of Russia. In 1972, he once again reaffirmed his belief when talking to BBC journalists Anthony Summers and Tom Mangold, who were writing the File on the Tsar.

Sigismund died in Puntarenas, Costa Rica, on 14 November 1978.

== Honours and awards ==
Prince Sigismund received the following awards:

- Order of the Black Eagle, Knight (Kingdom of Prussia)
- Order of the Red Eagle, Grand Cross with Crown (Kingdom of Prussia)
- Order of the Prussian Crown, Grand Cross (Kingdom of Prussia)
- Royal House Order of Hohenzollern, Grand Commander (Kingdom of Prussia)
- Princely House Order of Hohenzollern, Cross of Honour 1st Class (House of Hohenzollern-Sigmaringen)

== Ancestry ==
Ancestors of Prince Sigismund of Prussia (born 1896)

8. Wilhelm I, German Emperor
4. Frederick III, German Emperor
9. Princess Augusta of Saxe-Weimar-Eisenach
2. Prince Henry of Prussia
10. Prince Albert of Saxe-Coburg and Gotha
5. Victoria, Princess Royal
11. Queen Victoria of the United Kingdom
1. Prince Sigismund of Prussia
12. Prince Charles of Hesse and by Rhine
6. Louis IV, Grand Duke of Hesse and by Rhine
13. Princess Elisabeth of Prussia
3. Princess Irene of Hesse and by Rhine
14. Prince Albert of Saxe-Coburg and Gotha (= 10)
7. Princess Alice of the United Kingdom
15. Queen Victoria of the United Kingdom (= 11)

== See also ==
- House of Hohenzollern
- Family tree of the German monarchs
