= Princess Thyra of Denmark =

Danish princess (1853–1933)

Thyra of Denmark
- Crown Princess of Hanover; Duchess of Cumberland and Teviotdale
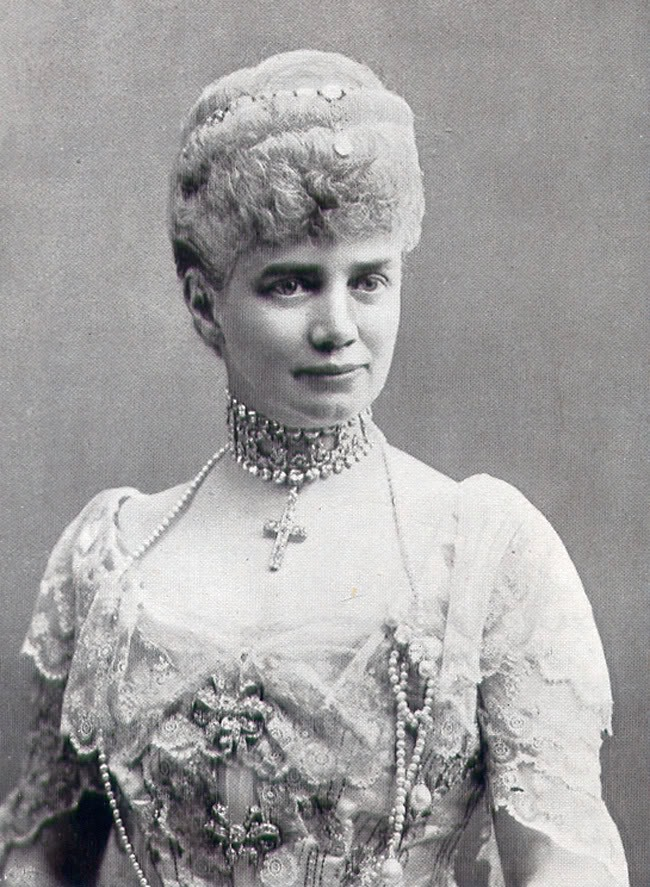
- Princess Thyra c. 1900s
- Born: 29 September 1853; Yellow Palace, Copenhagen, Denmark
- Died: 26 February 1933 (aged 79); Schloss Cumberland, Gmunden, Austria
- Burial: 7 March 1933; Schloss Cumberland, Gmunden, Austria
- Spouse: Ernest Augustus, Crown Prince of Hanover (m. 1878; died 1923)
- Issue Detail: Marie Louise, Margravine of Baden; George William, Hereditary Prince of Hanover; Alexandra, Grand Duchess of Mecklenburg-Schwerin; Princess Olga; Prince Christian; Ernest Augustus, Duke of Brunswick and Prince of Hanover
Names
- Thyra Amalie Caroline Charlotte Anna
- House: Glücksburg
- Father: Christian IX of Denmark
- Mother: Louise of Hesse-Kassel

Princess Thyra of Denmark (Thyra Amalie Caroline Charlotte Anna; 29 September 1853 – 26 February 1933) was the youngest daughter and fifth child of Christian IX of Denmark and Louise of Hesse-Kassel. In 1878, she married Ernest Augustus, the exiled heir to the Kingdom of Hanover. As the Kingdom of Hanover had been annexed by Prussia in 1866, she spent most of her life in exile with her husband in Austria.

Thyra was the sister of King Frederik VIII of Denmark, Queen Alexandra of the United Kingdom, King George I of Greece, Empress Maria Feodorovna of Russia and Prince Valdemar of Denmark.

== Birth and family ==
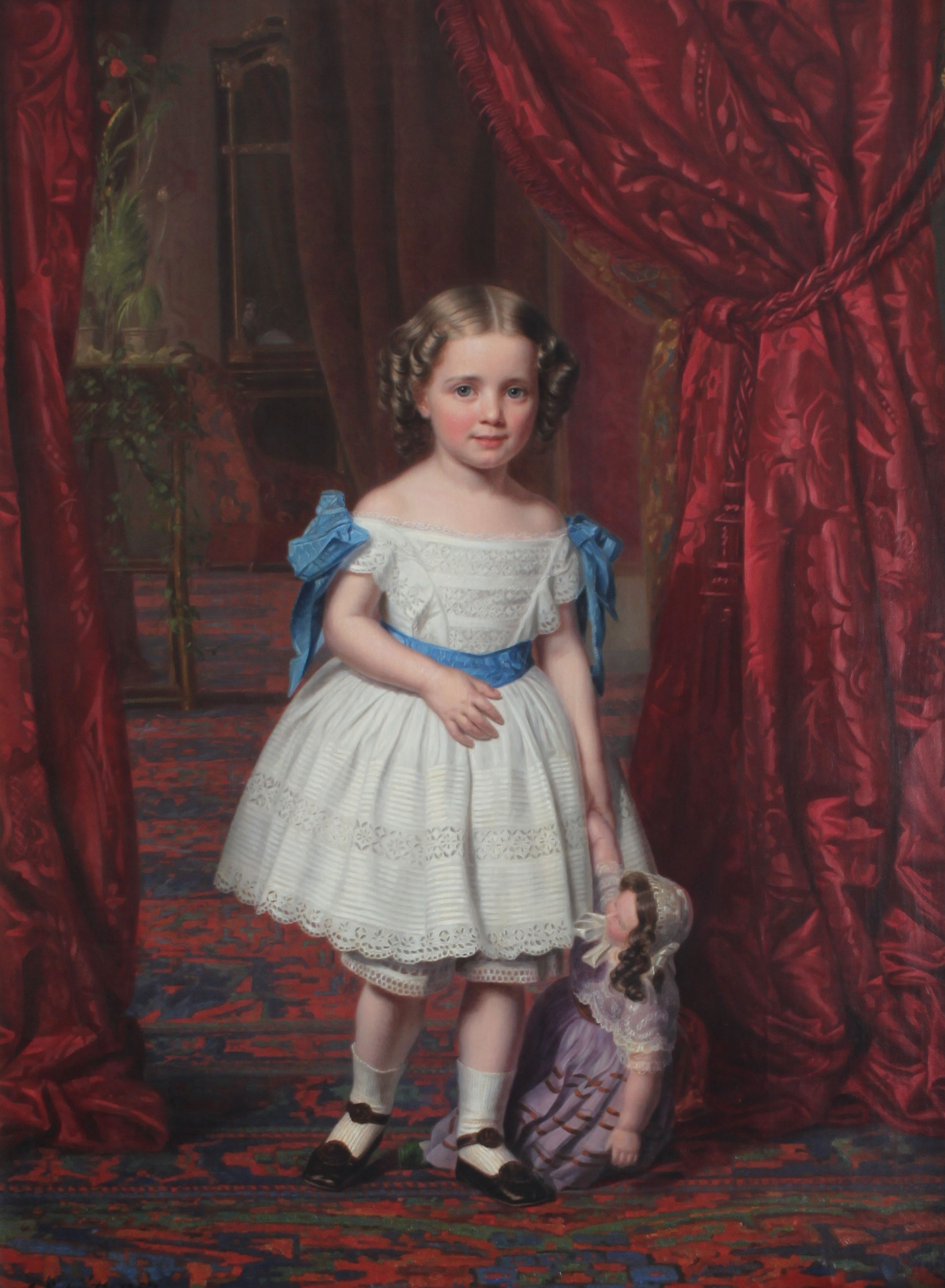
Painting by August Schiøtt, 1857

Thyra was born on 29 September 1853 at the Yellow Palace, an 18th-century town house at 18 Amaliegade, immediately adjacent to the Amalienborg Palace complex in Copenhagen. She was the third daughter and fifth child of Prince Christian and Princess Louise of Denmark. As a child, she shared a bedroom with her elder sisters, Alexandra and Dagmar, and was taught how to sew and knit her own clothes and socks. Her family had been relatively obscure but happy until her father, Prince Christian of Schleswig-Holstein-Sonderburg-Glücksburg, was chosen with the consent of the great powers to succeed his childless distant cousin, Frederick VII, to the Danish throne. Just two months before Thyra's birth, the new Act of Succession had been passed and Prince Christian was given the title of Prince of Denmark.

== Early life ==
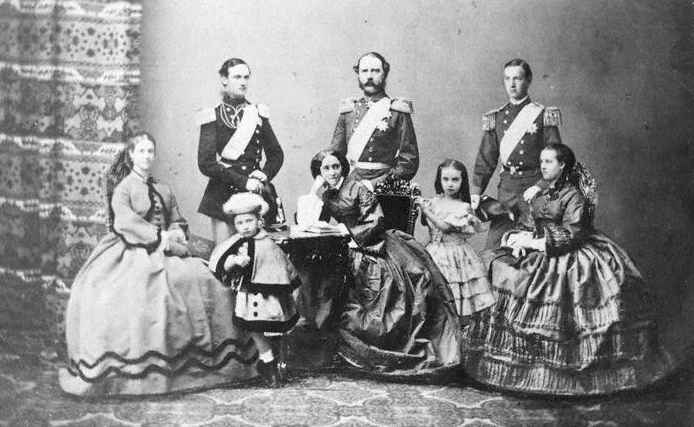
Left to right: Dagmar, Frederik, Valdemar, Queen Louise, King Christian IX, Thyra, George and Alexandra, in 1862

In 1863, when Thyra was 10 years old, King Frederick VII died, and her father succeeded to the throne of Denmark as King Christian IX. Earlier the same year, her brother Vilhelm had been elected King of Greece, and her sister Alexandra had married Albert Edward, Prince of Wales. In 1866, her other sister Dagmar married the Tsarevich of Russia, Alexander. Princess Thyra was confirmed on 27 May 1870 by the Bishop of Zealand, Hans Lassen Martensen, in the chapel of Christiansborg Palace in Copenhagen.

In 1871, at 18 years of age, Thyra had an affair with Vilhelm Frimann Marcher, a lieutenant in the cavalry, which resulted in a pregnancy. To avoid scandal, Thyra fled to Greece to be with her brother, George I of Greece. When her father Christian IX learned that Thyra was "unwell", from the Greek media, he rushed to Greece to be with her. When Thyra gave birth in Athens, the baby was immediately given up for adoption. The Danish press was told Thyra had been taken ill with jaundice.

Thyra was an attractive and gentle young woman, with dark hair and dark blue eyes, and Queen Louise wanted her youngest daughter to make a good marriage as her elder daughters had. Thyra's first suitor was King William III of the Netherlands, but as he was thirty-six years older than she was, she rejected him.

== Marriage ==
During a family visit to Germany in 1878, Louise and Alexandra left, saying that they were going to attend an optician consultation. However, they were actually arranging a meeting between Thyra and Ernest Augustus of Hanover, Crown Prince of Hanover, 3rd Duke of Cumberland and Teviotdale. Ernest Augustus was the eldest child and only son of the exiled King George V of Hanover and his wife, Princess Marie of Saxe-Altenburg. Thyra wrote in her journal that she was "very excited" to meet the Crown Prince. Ernest Augustus had been born as a Crown Prince of Hanover, but in 1866 his father had been deprived of his throne, when the Kingdom of Hanover was annexed by Prussia after siding with Austria in the Austro-Prussian War. Ernest Augustus had Cumberland Castle in Gmunden, Austria, built in 1882 as exile seat. Despite this, Thyra wrote that she believed Ernest Augustus would one day ascend the Hanoverian throne.

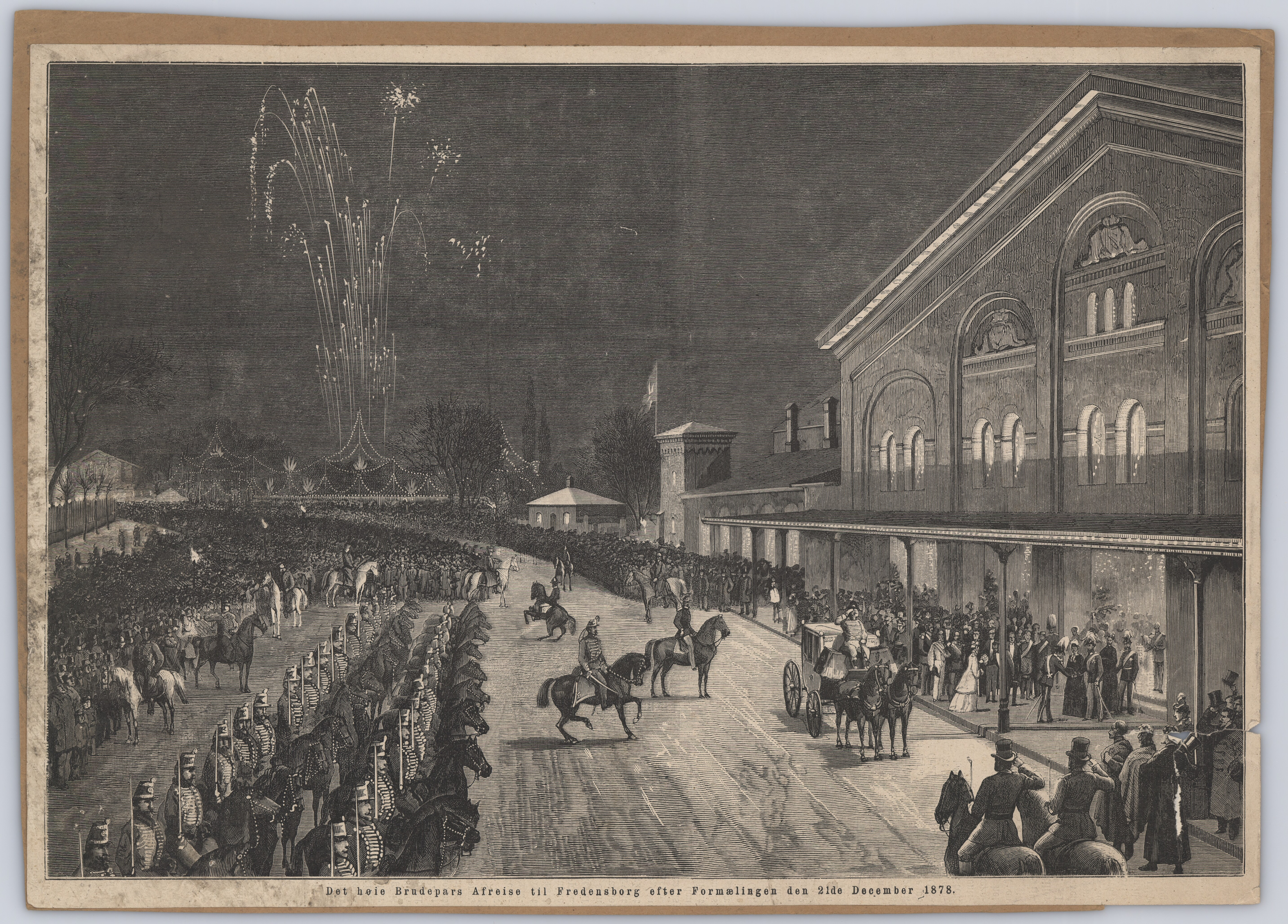
The newlyweds depart Copenhagen Central Station after the wedding in 1878.

Upon meeting, Thyra's hand was immediately kissed by Ernest Augustus, while Alexandra peeked from around the corner. After some time, Thyra proposed to Ernest Augustus. While Thyra's family was excited, Queen Victoria stated that her engagement was "completely without foundation" after failing to marry off one of her own sons to Thyra. In December 1878, Thyra married Ernest Augustus at the Chapel Royal of Christiansborg Palace in Copenhagen.

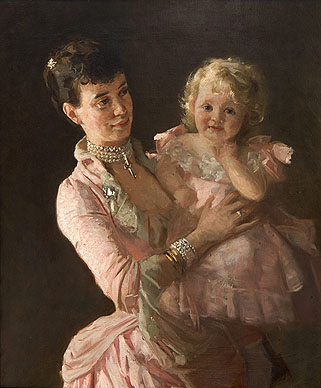
Thyra with her daughter, Olga.

== Later life ==
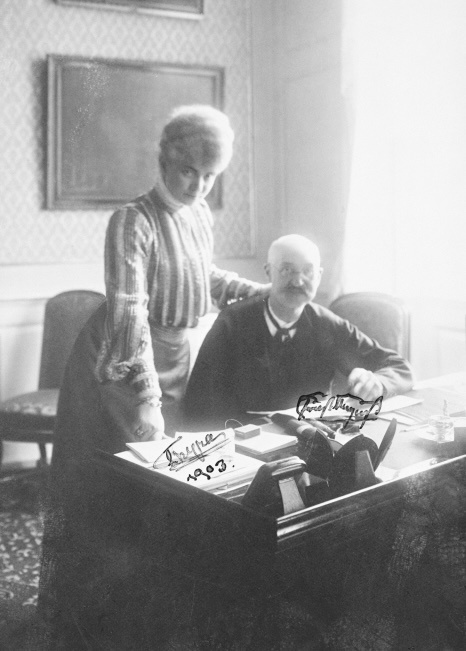
Ernest Augustus and Thyra in 1903

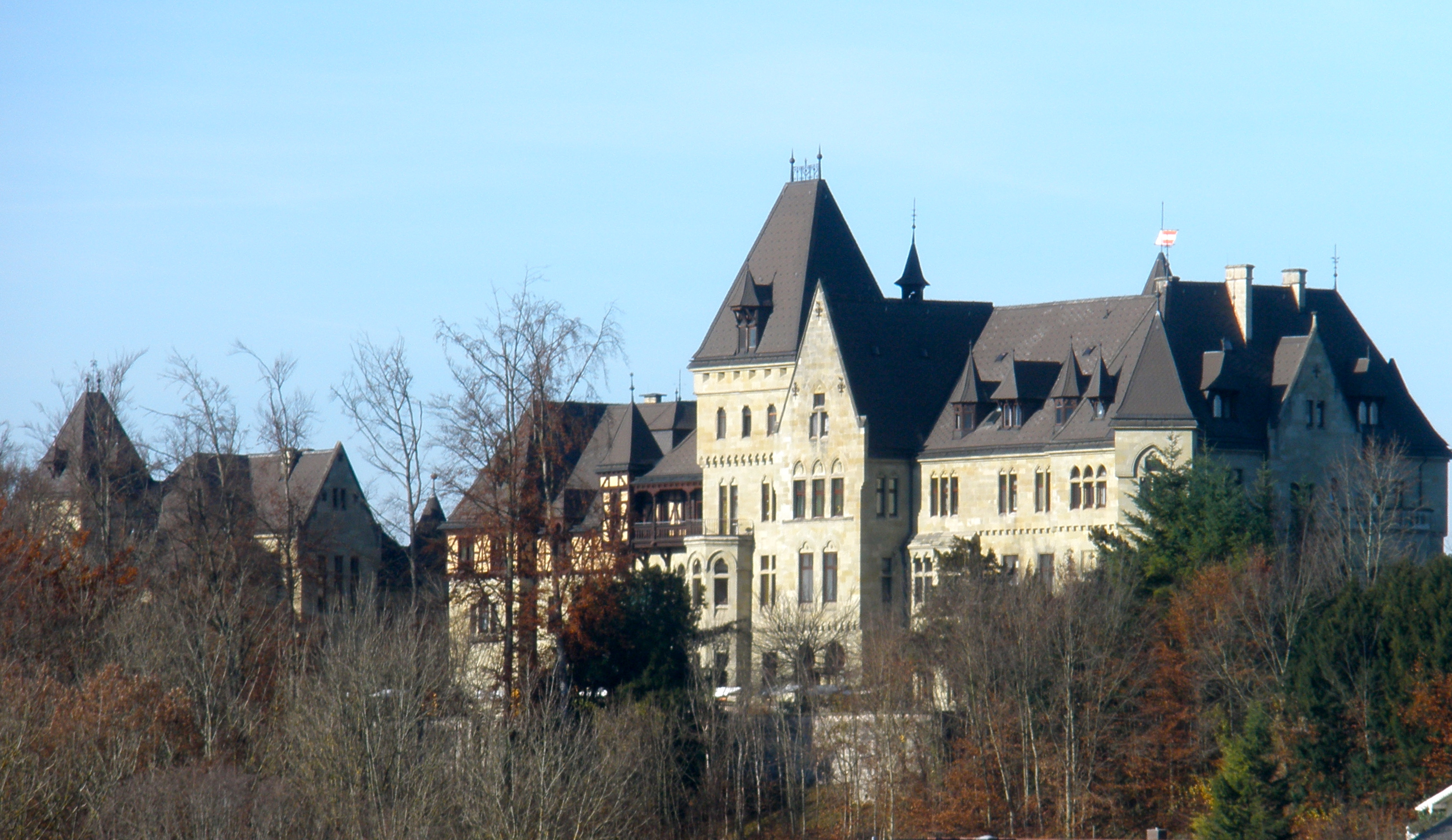
Schloss Cumberland in Gmunden, built after their marriage in 1882

After the wedding, the couple took up residence in Gmunden, Upper Austria, where Thyra lived for most of her life at Schloss Cumberland. They also had a townhouse in Vienna. The couple remained close; Thyra supported her husband's claim to the Hanoverian throne even as they led a largely private life. The couple had six children, three sons and three daughters.

In 1912, Thyra's eldest son, George William, Hereditary Prince of Hanover died in a car accident while driving from Prague to Copenhagen for the funeral of her brother, Frederick VIII of Denmark. It was a loss from which Thyra never fully recovered. As the accident happened in Germany, Kaiser Wilhelm II organised a guard of honour, and Thyra and Ernest Augustus sent their youngest son, also called Ernest Augustus, to Berlin to represent them, and to thank the Kaiser in response to his gesture. Whilst in Berlin, Ernest Augustus fell in love with the Kaiser's only daughter, Princess Victoria Louise of Prussia. A wedding was arranged and on the 24 May 1913 they were married, the wedding formally ended the decades-long rift between the House of Hanover and House of Hohenzollern.

Under the Titles Deprivation Act 1917, the British government deprived Ernest Augustus of his British peerage as Duke of Cumberland after he served in the German Army during the First World War, a decision that also removed Thyra from her status as Duchess of Cumberland, prompting her to remark that "England has destroyed my Duke and accuses him of treason." In her later years, Thyra moved out of Schloss Cumberland, and into a smaller residence close by.

Ernest Augustus died of a stroke on 14 November 1923. Thyra survived him by nine years and died in Gmunden, Upper Austria, on 26 February 1933.

== Issue ==
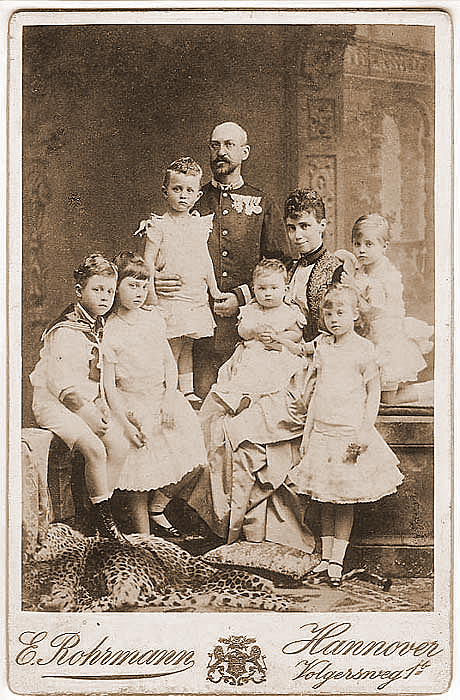
The Duke and Duchess of Cumberland with their children

The Duke and Duchess of Cumberland and Teviotdale had six children:

Name	Birth	Death	Notes
Princess Marie Louise of Hanover and Cumberland	11 October 1879	31 January 1948	married Prince Maximilian of Baden (10 July 1867 – 6 November 1929); had issue
Prince George William of Hanover and Cumberland	28 October 1880	20 May 1912	Prince George William died in an automobile accident while driving to attend the funeral of his uncle, King Frederik VIII of Denmark.
Princess Alexandra of Hanover and Cumberland	29 September 1882	30 August 1963	married Friedrich Franz IV, Grand Duke of Mecklenburg-Schwerin (9 April 1882 – 17 November 1945); had issue
Princess Olga of Hanover and Cumberland	11 July 1884	21 September 1958	Died unmarried.
Prince Christian of Hanover and Cumberland	4 July 1885	3 September 1901	Died young.
Prince Ernest Augustus of Hanover, Duke of Brunswick	17 November 1887	30 January 1953	married Princess Viktoria Luise of Prussia (13 September 1892 – 11 December 1980); had issue

== Ancestry ==
Ancestors of Princess Thyra of Denmark

8. Frederick Charles Louis, Duke of Schleswig-Holstein-Sonderburg-Beck
4. Frederick William, Duke of Schleswig-Holstein-Sonderburg-Glücksburg
9. Countess Friederike von Schlieben
2. Christian IX of Denmark
10. Prince Charles of Hesse-Kassel
5. Princess Louise Caroline of Hesse-Kassel
11. Princess Louise of Denmark
1. Princess Thyra of Denmark
12. Prince Frederick of Hesse-Kassel
6. Prince William of Hesse-Kassel
13. Princess Caroline of Nassau-Usingen
3. Princess Louise of Hesse-Kassel
14. Frederick, Hereditary Prince of Denmark
7. Princess Charlotte of Denmark
15. Duchess Sophia Frederica of Mecklenburg-Schwerin

Princess Thyra of Denmark House of Schleswig-Holstein-Sonderburg-Glücksburg Cadet branch of the House of Oldenburg Born: 29 September 1853 Died: 26 February 1933
Titles in pretence
Preceded by Marie of Saxe-Altenburg	— TITULAR — Queen consort of Hanover; 22 December 1878 – 14 November 1923; Reason for succession failure: Hanover annexed by Prussia in 1866	Succeeded by Victoria Louise of Prussia
