= List of grand duchesses of Russia =

Female members of the Russian Imperial Family

This is a list of those members of the Russian Imperial House who bore the title velikaia kniaginia (Russian: великая княгиня) or velikaia knazhna (Russian: великая княжна) (usually translated into French and English as grand duchess, but more accurately grand princess). This courtesy title was borne (usually) by daughters and male-line granddaughters of the emperors and empresses of Russia, as well as by wives of grand dukes of Russia, all along with the style of Her Imperial Highness.

== Grand duchesses of Russia by birth ==
Picture	Name	Father	Born	Died	Marriage	Notes
	Anna Petrovna	Peter Alexeievich	27 January 1708	4 March 1728	Charles Frederick, Duke of Holstein-Gottorp (m. 1725)	
	Elizabeth Petrovna later, Elizabeth, Empress of Russia	Peter Alexeievich	29 December 1709	5 January 1762		Ascended the throne in 1741.
	Natalya Alexeyevna	Alexei Petrovich	21 July 1714	22 November 1728		Died unmarried.
	Anna Leopoldovna	Karl Leopold, Duke of Mecklenburg	18 December 1718	19 March 1746	Duke Anton Ulrich of Brunswick (m. 1739)	Assumed title rather than received it.
	Anna Petrovna	Peter Feodorovich	9 December 1757	8 March 1759		Died in infancy.
	Alexandra Pavlovna	Pavel Petrovich	9 August 1783	16 March 1801	Archduke Josef, Palatine of Hungary (m. 1799)	
	Elena Pavlovna	Pavel Petrovich	24 December 1784	24 September 1803	Friedrich Ludwig, Hereditary Duke of Mecklenburg-Schwerin (m. 1799)	
	Maria Pavlovna	Pavel Petrovich	16 February 1786	23 June 1859	Karl Friedrich, Hereditary Duke of Saxe-Weimar (m. 1804; d. 1853)	
	Catherine Pavlovna	Pavel Petrovich	21 May 1788	9 January 1819	Duke Georg of Oldenburg (m. 1809; d. 1812); Wilhelm I, King of Württemberg (m. 1816)	
	Olga Pavlovna	Pavel Petrovich	22 July 1792	26 January 1795		Died in infancy.
	Anna Pavlovna	Pavel Petrovich	18 January 1795	1 March 1865	Willem II, King of the Netherlands (m. 1816; d. 1849)	
	Maria Alexandrovna	Alexander Pavlovich	29 May 1799	8 August 1800		Died in infancy.
	Elizabeth Alexandrovna	Alexander Pavlovich	15 November 1806	12 May 1808		Died in infancy.
	Maria Nikolaievna	Nikolai Pavlovich	18 August 1819	21 February 1876	Maximilian de Beauharnais, 3rd Duke of Leuchtenberg (m. 1839; d. 1852); Count Grigori Stroganov (m. 1854)	
	Olga Nikolaievna	Nikolai Pavlovich	11 September 1822	30 October 1892	Karl, Crown Prince of Württemberg (m. 1846; d. 1891)	
	Maria Mikhailovna	Mikhail Pavlovich	9 March 1825	19 November 1846		Died unmarried.
	Alexandra Nikolaievna	Nikolai Pavlovich	24 June 1825	10 August 1844	Prince Friedrich Wilhelm of Hesse-Kassel (m. 1844)	
	Elizabeth Mikhailovna	Mikhail Pavlovich	26 May 1826	28 January 1845	Adolf, Duke of Nassau (m. 1844)	
	Catherine Mikhailovna	Mikhail Pavlovich	28 August 1827	12 May 1894	Duke Georg August of Mecklenburg-Strelitz (m. 1851; d. 1876)	
	Alexandra Mikhailovna	Mikhail Pavlovich	28 January 1831	27 March 1832		Died in infancy.
	Anna Mikhailovna	Mikhail Pavlovich	27 October 1834	22 March 1836		Died in infancy.
	Alexandra Alexandrovna	Alexander Nikolaievich	30 August 1842	10 July 1849		Died in infancy.
	Olga Konstantinovna	Konstantin Nikolaievich	3 September 1851	18 June 1926	George I, King of the Hellenes (m. 1867; d. 1913)	
	Maria Alexandrovna	Alexander Nikolaievich	17 October 1853	24 October 1920	Prince Alfred, Duke of Edinburgh (m. 1874; d. 1900)	
	Vera Konstantinovna	Konstantin Nikolaievich	16 February 1854	11 April 1912	Duke Eugen of Württemberg (m. 1874; d. 1877)	
	Anastasia Mikhailovna	Mikhail Nikolaievich	28 July 1860	11 March 1922	Friedrich Franz, Hereditary Grand Duke of Mecklenburg-Schwerin (m. 1879; d. 1897)	
	Xenia Alexandrovna	Alexander Alexandrovich	6 April 1875	20 April 1960	Grand Duke Alexander Mikhailovich (m. 1894; d. 1933)	
	Elena Vladimirovna	Vladimir Alexandrovich	29 January 1882	13 March 1957	Prince Nicholas of Greece and Denmark (m. 1902; d. 1938)	
	Olga Alexandrovna	Alexander Alexandrovich	13 June 1882	24 November 1960	Duke Peter Alexandrovich of Oldenburg (m. 1901; ann. 1916); Nikolai Alexandrovich Kulikovsky (m. 1916; d. 1958)	
	Maria Pavlovna	Pavel Alexandrovich	18 April 1890	13 December 1958	Prince Wilhelm, Duke of Södermanland (m. 1908; div. 1914); Prince Sergei Mikhailovich Putyatin (m. 1917; div. 1923)	
	Olga Nikolaevna	Nikolai Alexandrovich	15 November 1895	17 July 1918		Died unmarried.
	Tatiana Nikolaevna	Nikolai Alexandrovich	10 June 1897	17 July 1918		Died unmarried.
	Maria Nikolaevna	Nikolai Alexandrovich	26 June 1899	17 July 1918		Died unmarried.
	Anastasia Nikolaevna	Nikolai Alexandrovich	18 June 1901	17 July 1918		Died unmarried.

== Grand duchesses of Russia by pretence ==
After 1917, no such daughter was born into the deposed imperial house who would have been entitled to the title grand duchess - i.e., had been a male-line granddaughter of a reigning emperor; although such would have been technically possible, as there lived sons of reigning emperors and their daughters would have been so entitled.

Picture	Name	Father	Born	Died	Husband	Notes
	Maria Kirillovna	Kirill Vladimirovich	2 February 1907	25 October 1951	Karl, 6th Prince of Leiningen (m. 1925; d. 1946)	Born as Princess of Russia; adopted the style of Grand Duchess after her father's headship of the House of Romanov.
	Kira Kirillovna	Kirill Vladimirovich	9 May 1909	8 September 1967	Louis Ferdinand, Prince of Prussia (m. 1938)	Born as Princess of Russia; adopted the style of Grand Duchess after her father's headship of the House of Romanov.
	Maria Vladimirovna	Vladimir Kirillovich	23 December 1953	alive	Prince Franz Wilhelm of Prussia (m. 1976; div. 1985)	Born after the abolition of the monarchy; adopted the style of Grand Duchess of Russia in pretense.

== Grand duchesses of Russia by marriage ==
Picture	Name	Husband	Date of marriage	Born	Died	Notes
	Charlotte Christine of Brunswick-Lüneburg	Alexei Petrovich	25 October 1711	29 August 1694	13 November 1715	
	Sophie of Anhalt-Zerbst; Catherine Alexeievna	Peter Feodorovich	1 September 1745	2 May 1729	17 November 1796	Known to history as 'Catherine the Great'. Became Empress Consort when her husband succeeded as Peter III in 1762. Became Empress Regnant 9 July 1762 on deposing her husband.
	Wilhelmina Louisa of Hesse-Darmstadt; Natalia Alexeievna	Pavel Petrovich	10 October 1773	25 June 1755	26 April 1776	
	Sophie Dorothea of Württemberg; Maria Feodorovna	Pavel Petrovich	7 October 1776	25 October 1759	5 November 1828	Became Empress when her husband succeeded as Paul I in 1796.
	Louise of Baden; Elizabeth Alexeievna	Alexander Pavlovich	9 October 1793	24 January 1779	16 May 1826	Became Empress when her husband succeeded as Alexander I in 1801.
	Juliane of Saxe-Coburg-Saalfeld; Anna Feodorovna	Konstantin Pavlovich	26 February 1796	23 September 1781	15 August 1860	Annulled 1820.
	Charlotte of Prussia; Alexandra Feodorovna	Nikolai Pavlovich	13 July 1817	13 July 1798	1 November 1860	Became Empress when her husband succeeded as Nicholas I in 1825.
	Charlotte of Württemberg; Elena Pavlovna	Mikhail Pavlovich	19 February 1824	9 January 1807	2 February 1873	
	Marie of Hesse and by Rhine; Maria Alexandrovna	Alexander Nikolaievich	28 April 1841	8 August 1824	3 June 1880	Became Empress when her husband succeeded as Alexander II in 1855.
	Alexandra of Saxe-Altenburg; Alexandra Iosifovna	Konstantin Nikolaievich	11 September 1848	8 July 1830	6 July 1911	
	Alexandra of Oldenburg; Alexandra Petrovna	Nikolai Nikolaievich	6 February 1856	2 June 1838	25 April 1900	
	Cecilie of Baden; Olga Feodorovna	Mikhail Nikolaievich	28 August 1857	20 September 1839	12 April 1891	
	Dagmar of Denmark; Maria Feodorovna	Alexander Alexandrovich	9 November 1866	26 November 1847	13 October 1928	Became Empress when her husband succeeded as Alexander III in 1881.
	Marie of Mecklenburg-Schwerin; Maria Pavlovna	Vladimir Alexandrovich	28 August 1874	14 May 1854	6 September 1920	
	Elisabeth of Saxe-Altenburg; Elizabeth Mavrikievna	Konstantin Konstantinovich	27 April 1884	25 January 1865	24 March 1927	
	Elisabeth of Hesse and by Rhine; Elizabeth Feodorovna	Sergei Alexandrovich	15 June 1884	1 November 1864	17 or 18 July 1918	
	Alexandra of Greece and Denmark; Alexandra Georgievna	Pavel Alexandrovich	17 June 1889	30 August 1870	24 September 1891	
	Milica of Montenegro; Militza Nikolaevna	Peter Nikolaievich	26 July 1889	14 July 1866	5 September 1951	
	Alix of Hesse and by Rhine; Alexandra Feodorovna	Nicholas Alexandrovich	26 November 1894	6 June 1872	17 July 1918	Became Grand Duchess of Russia after she was received into the Russian Orthodox Church. This was a day after her fiancé succeeded as Emperor Nicholas II. Became Empress on her marriage to the Emperor on 26 November 1894.
	Maria of Greece and Denmark; Maria Georgievna	George Mikhailovich	12 May 1900	3 March 1876	14 December 1940	
	Victoria Melita of Saxe-Coburg and Gotha; Victoria Feodorovna	Kirill Vladimirovich	8 October 1905	25 November 1876	2 March 1936	
	Anastasia of Montenegro; Anastasia Nikolaievna	Nikolai Nikolaievich	29 April 1907	4 January 1868	25 January 1929	
	Leonida Bagration of Mukhrani; Leonida Georgievna	Vladimir Kirillovich	13 August 1948	6 October 1914	23 May 2010	Wife and mother of the heads of the House of Romanov in exile.

Imperial Standard of the grand duchesses

Although male grand dukes of Russia (sons or male-line grandsons of reigning emperors) existed after 1917, when the imperial house was deposed, none of them contracted an equal marriage after that date; so the title grand duchess was not gained by marriage thereafter — though it would have been technically possible.

Note that a grand duke or grand duchess as a translation is not necessarily associated with a grand duchy; see the relevant articles for more information.

A Russian grand duchess was styled as Her Imperial Highness. With the exception of Charlotte-Christine, women marrying into the Imperial family converted to Russian Orthodoxy (except for the Montenegrin and Greek princesses, who were already Orthodox). They also took Russian names — of the 17 converts: four took patronyms using their fathers' names, eight took Fyodorovna (after the Feodorovskaya Icon of the Mother of God, notable examples include Alexandra Feodorovna, Empress of Russia) three took Alexeievna (Catherine II and her daughter in law, Natalia Alexeievna (Wilhelmina Louisa of Hesse-Darmstadt)) one took Alexandrovna (her husband's name) and one Pavlovna (her husband's patronym, the late Paul I); eight also changed their own given name.

== See also ==
- List of grand dukes of Russia
