= Duke Georg Alexander of Mecklenburg-Strelitz =

German noble (1859–1909)

Duke Georg Alexander
- Duke of Mecklenburg-Strelitz
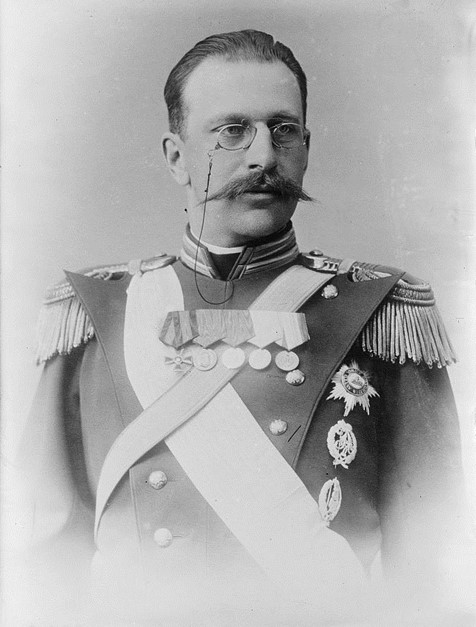
- Portrait, 1900–1908
- Born: 6 June 1859; Remplin, Grand Duchy of Mecklenburg-Strelitz
- Died: 5 December 1909 (aged 50); St. Petersburg, Russia
- Spouse: Natalia Feodorovna Vanljarskaya (m. 1890)
- Issue: Countess Catherine of Carlow; Countess Maria of Carlow; Countess Natalia of Carlow; George, Duke of Mecklenburg-Strelitz
Names
- Georg Alexander Michael Friedrich Wilhelm Franz Karl
- House: Mecklenburg-Strelitz
- Father: Duke Georg August of Mecklenburg-Strelitz
- Mother: Grand Duchess Catherine Mikhailovna of Russia

Duke Georg Alexander of Mecklenburg-Strelitz (Russian: Георгий Георгиевич Мекленбург-Стрелицкий, romanized: Georgy Georgiyevich Meklenburg-Strelitsky; 6 June 1859 – 5 December 1909) was the eldest of the two surviving sons of Duke Georg August of Mecklenburg-Strelitz and of Grand Duchess Catherine Mikhailovna of Russia. He was a great-grandson of Emperor Paul I of Russia and a cousin of Emperor Alexander III of Russia. Although he was a German prince of the House of Mecklenburg-Strelitz, he was raised in Russia, where he lived all his life.

He followed a career as an officer in the Russian army; he received the rank of major general and was commander of the Life Guard Dragoon Regiment. Georg Alexander was a music lover, a skillful cellist and composer. In 1896, he formed a private string quartet called the Mecklenburg Quartet. He contracted a morganatic marriage and his rights and inheritance passed to his younger brother, Charles Michael, Duke of Mecklenburg. His four children received the title of counts of Carlow, but after Duke Georg Alexander's death, his unmarried brother adopted his son Georg, Count of Carlow, who became the heir to the House of Mecklenburg-Strelitz in 1934.

== Early life ==
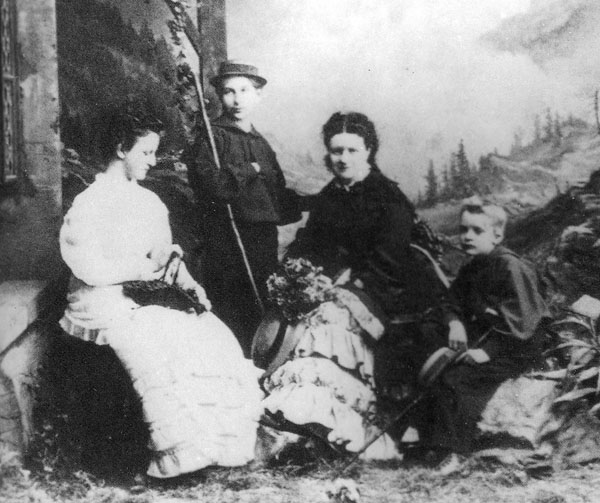
Grand Duchess Catherine Mikhailovna of Russia surrounded by her children: Duchess Helene, Duke Georg Alexander and Duke Karl Michael (c. 1870)

Georg Alexander Michael Friedrich Wilhelm Franz Carl of Mecklenburg-Strelitz was born on 6 June [O.S. 25 May] 1859 at Remplin, a family estate acquired by his parents in Mecklenburg shortly before his birth. His father, Duke Georg August of Mecklenburg (1824–1876), was the second son of Grand Duke Georg of Mecklenburg-Strelitz. His mother, Grand Duchess Catherine Mikhailovna of Russia, was a granddaughter of Emperor Paul I of Russia. Although Duke Georg Alexander was, by birth, a German prince of the house of Mecklenburg-Strelitz, his father had settled in Russia within his wife’s family. Georg and his siblings were raised in Russia, but kept the Lutheran religion of his paternal ancestors. He was known in Russia as George Georgievich jr, to distinguish him from his father who had the same name and patronymic.

He received a military education and followed a career in the Russian service. Raised in the Mikhailovsky Palace, the household of his maternal grandmother Grand Duchess Elena Pavlovna, he took a great interest in music from an early age under her grandmother's guidance. From age 12 his teacher was Karl Davydov, a composer, professor of the St Petersburg Conservatory and Russia’s most prominent cellist of the time. Georg-Alexander passion for music made him consider for a time to follow a career as a professional cellist. He was a good pianist, an excellent cello player and was fond of writing musical compositions. From 1879 to 1881 he studied fine arts and philosophy at the Universities of Leipzig and Strasbourg.

== Marriage ==
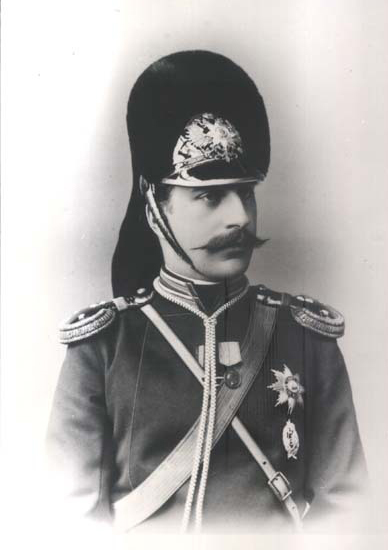
Duke Georg Alexander of Mecklenburg-Strelitz in military uniform.

Georg Alexander fell in love with his mother’s lady in waiting Natalia Feodorovna Vanljarskaya (Saint Petersburg, 16 May 1858 – Cannes, 14 March 1921), the daughter of Feodor Ardalionovich Vanliarsky (23 December 1833 – 2 February 1903), a Russian State Councillor, who served in the Ministry of Finance, and wife Maria Feodorovna Uvarova, paternal granddaughter of Ardalion Alexeievich Vanliarsky and wife Anastasia Mikhailovna Simanovskaya (died 26 March 1891) and maternal granddaughter of Feodor Feodorovich Uvarov and wife Maria Petrovna Joukova. She was a member of the Russian nobility who came from Germany in 17th century whose name was originally von Lahr. Vanljarskya was a skillful singer and the couple was brought together by their shared passion for music. Grand Duchess Catherine Mikahilovna opposed their union and fired Natalia, hoping that his son would forget the affair and would marry a bride of royal background. However Georg Alexander persisted and in June 1889 he went to Germany to obtain the permission to marry from the head of the family, his uncle, Grand Duke Frederick William (1819-1904). With his uncle's consent, George Georgievich married Natalia Vanliarskya on 14 February 1890 in Saint Petersburg. As Natalia was neither member of the reigning royal or mediatised family, their union was treated as morganatic and she received from the Duke of Mecklenburg-Strelitz the title of Countess von Carlow (the name Carlow came from the estate Karlovka in Poltava province, that belonged to Georg-Alexander) on 18 March 1890 that would pass to their children. Their marriage was a happy one and Natalia eventually became loved by her husband’s family.

The couple initially lived in a western wing of the Mikhailovsky palace, where fifteen rooms were given to them. After the death of Grand Duchess Catherine Mikhailovna in 1894, the Mikhailovsky palace and the bulk of her inheritance passed to Duke Georg Alexander's younger brother Karl Michael and their sister Helene. The palace was bought by Emperor Nicholas II in 1895 to house the collection of the Russian Museum, named in honor of Emperor Alexander III. Georg Alexander moved with his family to his own residence located at No 46 Fontanka embankment. The house was designed with his own personal plans and immediately became a center for musicians and artist. During the first years of their marriage, Vanljarskya did not take part in court life and only years later she began to accompany her husband at court balls and receptions in the Winter Palace.

The couple's four children received the title of Counts of Carlow after the mother:

- Countess Catherine von Carlow (25 July 1891 – 9 October 1940, victim of a German air aid on London), married Prince Vladimir Galitzine in 1913.
- Countess Maria von Carlow (31 October 1893 – 5 September 1979), who married Prince Boris Dmitrievich Golitsyn (1892–1919) in 1916, became a widow in 1919, and married Count Vladimir Petrovich Kleinmichel (1901–1982).
- Countess Natalia von Carlow (20 November 1894 – 4 December 1913).
- George, Duke of Mecklenburg (5 Oct 1899 – 6 Jul 1963).

== Later life ==
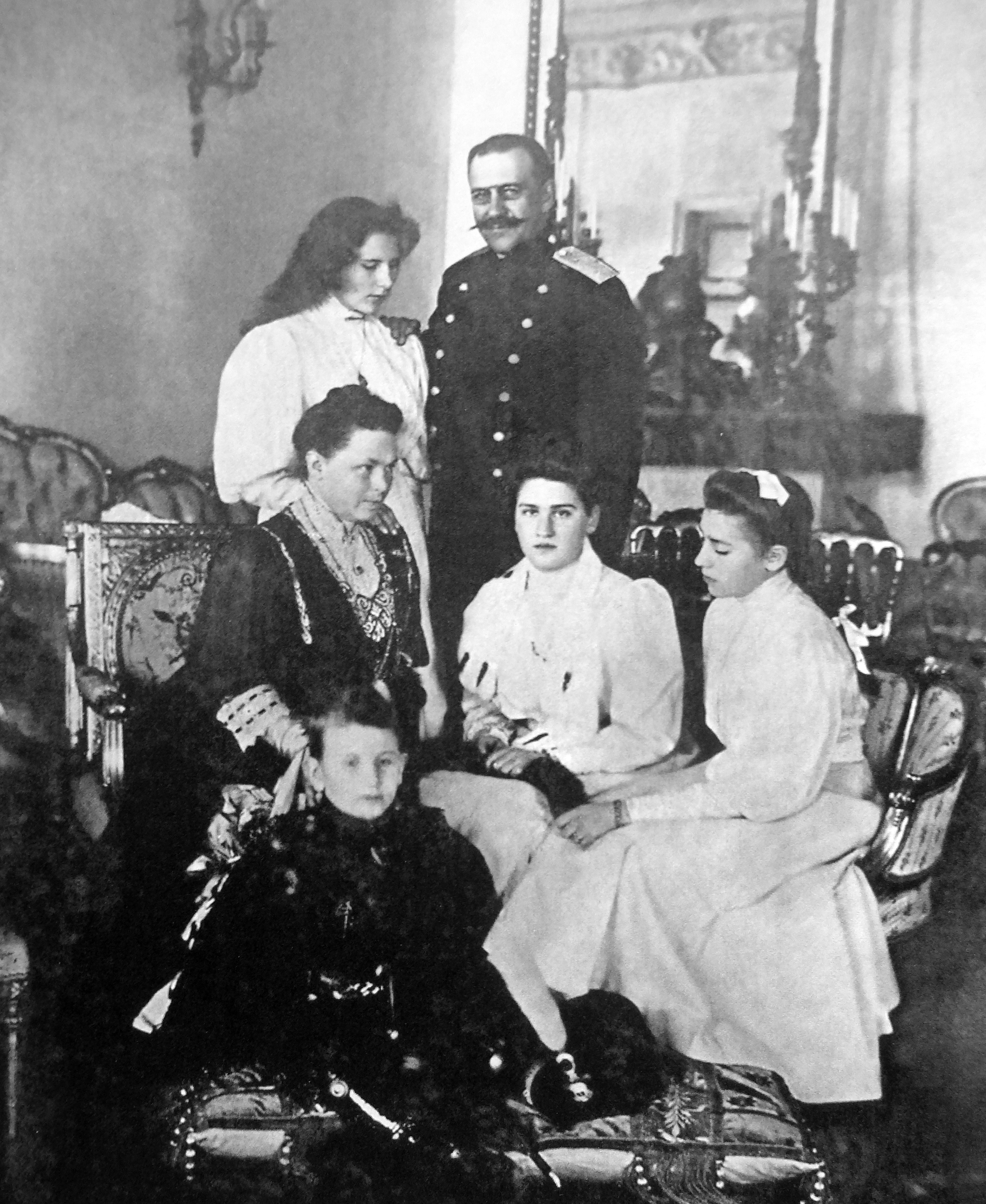
Duke Georg Alexander of Mecklenburg-Strelitz with his wife and their children: Catherine, Maria, Natalia and George

Georg Alexander was head of the committee for the fiftieth anniversary of the career of Anton Rubinstein celebrated in 1889. After Rubinstein’s death in 1894, his family gave his conducting baton to Duke Georg Alexander. In 1896, Georg Alexander organized a string quartet, which bore the name "Mecklenburg Quartet" (after 1917, it became part of the Petrograd Philharmonic). Performances were a great success not only in the Russian capital, but also abroad. It was the first Russian quartet to go on a European tour, receiving favorable reviews at their London performance in 1907.

Duke Georg Alexander was also an art collector. From his grandfather, Grand Duke Mikhail Pavlovich, he inherited a rich collection of French lithographs, paintings, Meissen porcelain and luxury editions of books. He constantly added new works to his collections and participated in exhibitions. Georg Alexander was well respected not only in the music world. Despite his high rank, he was an approachable man devoid of any snobbery.

Parallel to his passion for music he continued with his military career. In 1902 he was appointed Major General, Commander of the Life Guard Dragoon Regiment and from 1906 commander of the 1st Brigade of the 1st Guards Cavalry Division. In 1907 he was made chief of the troops at the disposal of the Guard in Saint Petersburg Military District. He was engaged on military reforms on behalf of the minister of war. He was author and translator of military theory and historical works.

Duke Georg Alexander of Mecklenburg-Strelitz died suddenly on 5 December 1909, aged fifty. He was buried in the park of the palace of Oranienbaum, the summer residence in the Gulf of Finland of his family. Over his grave was erected a black marble cross with a plate that bore the inscription: "Here lies a deeply revered husband and father and a great citizen of Oranienbaum." After the revolution, the grave was destroyed and the inscription disappeared. His daughter Natalia, who died young, was also buried in Oranienbaum. The Duke's widow and their three other children survived the Russian revolution and emigrated to western Europe. Natalia died in Cannes France in 1921. The couple's youngest child and only son, George Alexander, was adopted by his uncle Karl-Michael, and then took the title of Duke of Mecklenburg, Count of Carlow. After the other lines of the house of Mecklenburg died out his descendants became their sole heirs. Georg Alexander's great-grandson, Duke Borwin, is the current head of the House of Mecklenburg.

== Orders and decorations ==
- Mecklenburg: Grand Cross of the House Order of the Wendish Crown, with Crown in Ore, 16 February 1876
- Saxe-Weimar-Eisenach: Grand Cross of the Order of the White Falcon, 1881
- (Saxe-Coburg and Gotha) (Duchy of Saxe-Altenburg) (Saxe-Meiningen) Ernestine duchies: Grand Cross of the Saxe-Ernestine House Order
- Russian Empire:
  - Knight of the Imperial Order of Saint Andrew the Apostle the First-called
  - Knight of the Imperial Order of Saint Prince Vladimir, 3rd and 4th Classes

== Ancestry ==
Ancestors of Duke Georg Alexander of Mecklenburg-Strelitz

8. Charles II, Grand Duke of Mecklenburg-Strelitz
4. George, Grand Duke of Mecklenburg-Strelitz
9. Princess Friederike of Hesse-Darmstadt
2. Duke Georg August of Mecklenburg-Strelitz
10. Prince Frederick of Hesse-Kassel
5. Princess Marie of Hesse-Kassel
11. Princess Caroline of Nassau-Usingen
1. Georg Alexander of Mecklenburg-Strelitz
12. Paul I of Russia
6. Grand Duke Michael Pavlovich of Russia
13. Duchess Sophie Dorothea of Württemberg
3. Grand Duchess Catherine Mikhailovna of Russia
14. Prince Paul of Württemberg
7. Princess Charlotte of Württemberg
15. Princess Charlotte of Saxe-Hildburghausen

== Bibliography ==
- Katin-Yartsev, M and Shumkov, A. Costume Ball at the Winter Palace. Russky Antiquariat, 2003, ISBN 5981290021
