= Olga Romanov =

Olga Romanov may refer to:

- Princess Olga Andreevna Romanoff
- Grand Duchess Olga of Russia (disambiguation), Grand Duchesses of Russia by birth
