= Princess Olga (disambiguation) =

Princess Olga may refer to

- Olga of Kiev (890/925–969)
- Grand Duchess Olga Pavlovna of Russia (1792–1795)
- Olga Nikolaevna of Russia (1822–1892)
- Grand Duchess Olga Feodorovna of Russia (1839–1891)
- Olga Constantinovna of Russia (1851–1926)
- Grand Duchess Olga Alexandrovna of Russia (1882–1960)
- Grand Duchess Olga Nikolaevna of Russia (1895–1918)
- Princess Olga of Greece and Denmark (1903–1997)
- Princess Olga Andreevna Romanoff (born 1950)
- Princess Olga of Savoy-Aosta (born 1971)
