= Grand Duchess Maria Mikhailovna of Russia =

Russian royal (1825-1846)

Grand Duchess Maria Mikhailovna
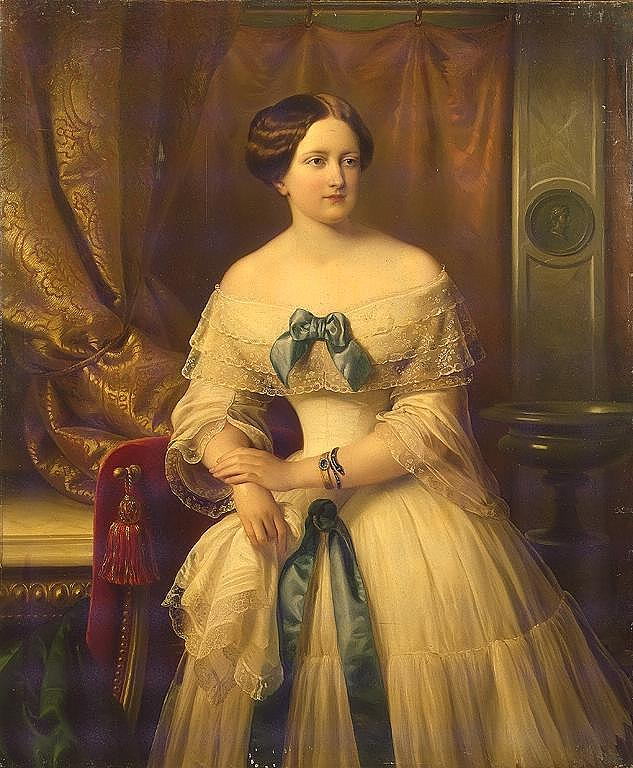
- Maria Mikhailovna of Russia by K.F. Sohn, completed a year after her death
- Born: Mariya Mikhailovna Romanova; 9 March 1825; Moscow, Russian Empire
- Died: 19 November 1846 (aged 21); Vienna, Austria
- House: Holstein-Gottorp-Romanov
- Father: Grand Duke Michael Pavlovich of Russia
- Mother: Princess Charlotte of Württemberg

Grand Duchess Maria Mikhailovna of Russia (Russian: Мария Михайловна; 9 March 1825 – 19 November 1846) was the firstborn child and eldest daughter of Grand Duke Michael Pavlovich of Russia and Princess Charlotte of Württemberg, who assumed the name Elena Pavlovna upon her conversion to Russian Orthodoxy.

== Biography ==
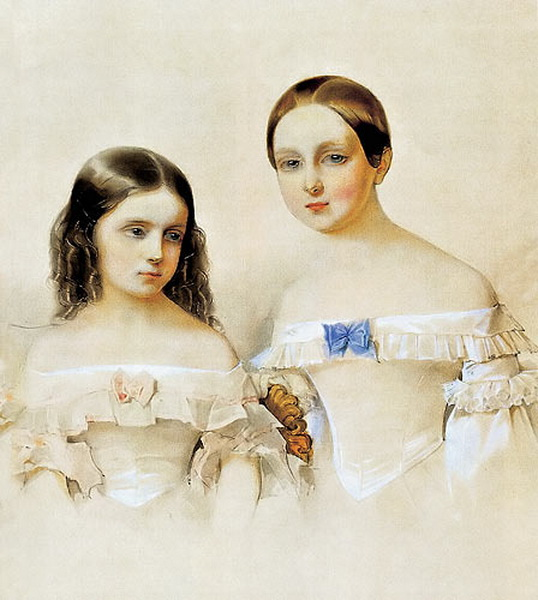
Grand Duchess Maria with her sister Catherine by Vladimir Ivanovich Hau, 1837.

Maria Mikhailovna was born on 9 March 1825 in Moscow. Her early education and domestic upbringing were heavily managed by her mother, focusing primarily on modern European languages, classical literature, and music. In 1835, her documented educational progress within the imperial court led to the publication of a contemporary children's literary periodical, titled Children's Library (edited by A. N. Ochkin), which was formally dedicated to her name.

While her mother supervised her academic studies, her father integrated elements of military training into her domestic program. Reflecting his position within the imperial army and his desire to raise his children under military observation, Grand Duke Michael Pavlovich designated each of his daughters as the honorary chief of a cavalry regiment. He introduced Maria Mikhailovna and her sisters to the standard infantry and cavalry communication signals conducted via the bugle and drum during family court reviews, though she did not assume any public political or active military roles.

During the early 1840s, internal court registries documented that Maria Mikhailovna was considered a potential marriage candidate for the Hereditary Prince of Baden, a dynastic alliance favored by Emperor Nicholas I to reinforce Russian diplomatic influence within the German confederation. However, the preliminary marital negotiations were permanently suspended without a formal betrothal due to the rapid decline of her physical health.

== Illness and death ==
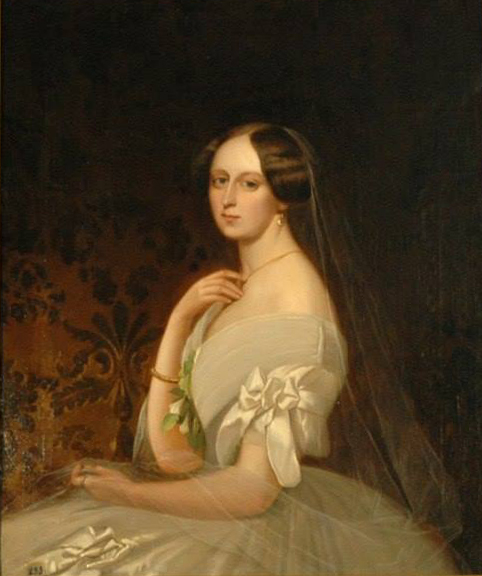
Grand Duchess Maria Mikhailovna by Carl Timoleon von Neff, circa 1840-1845

Maria Mikhailovna was documented within contemporary court registries for her fragile physical constitution, and the active symptoms of her underlying disease manifested prominently prior to her twentieth birthday. She died unmarried and without issue at the age of 21 on 19 November 1846 in Vienna, Austria, passing away in the presence of her father. Her remains were repatriated to St. Petersburg and interred within the imperial crypt at the Saints Peter and Paul Cathedral.

To preserve her memory alongside that of her sister, Grand Duchess Elizabeth Mikhailovna, who died during childbirth in January 1845, her mother founded the Elizabeth and Maria charitable shelters and children's medical clinics in St. Petersburg and Pavlovsk.

== Honours ==
- (Russian Empire) Dame Grand Cordon of the Imperial Order of Saint Catherine

== Ancestry ==
Ancestors of Grand Duchess Maria Mikhailovna of Russia

8. Peter III of Russia
4. Paul I of Russia
9. Catherine II of Russia
2. Grand Duke Michael Pavlovich of Russia
10. Frederick II Eugene, Duke of Württemberg
5. Duchess Sophie Dorothea of Württemberg
11. Princess Friederike of Brandenburg-Schwedt
1. Grand Duchess Maria Mikhailovna of Russia
12. Frederick I of Württemberg
6. Prince Paul of Württemberg
13. Duchess Augusta of Brunswick-Wolfenbüttel
3. Princess Charlotte of Württemberg
14. Frederick, Duke of Saxe-Altenburg
7. Princess Charlotte of Saxe-Hildburghausen
15. Duchess Charlotte Georgine of Mecklenburg-Strelitz
