= Grand Duchess Catherine Mikhailovna of Russia =

Grand Duchess of Russia

Grand Duchess Catherine Mikhailovna
- Duchess Georg August of Mecklenburg-Strelitz
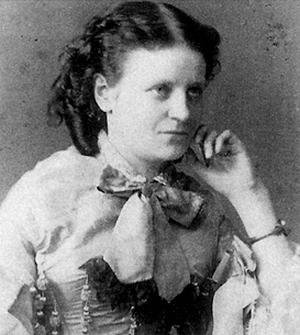
- Born: 28 August 1827; Saint Petersburg, Russian Empire
- Died: 12 May 1894 (aged 66); Saint Petersburg, Russian Empire
- Spouse: Duke Georg August of Mecklenburg-Strelitz (m. 1851; died 1876)
- Issue: Duke Nikolaus; Helene, Princess Albert of Saxe-Altenburg; Duke Georg Alexander; Duchess Maria-Frederica; Charles Michael, Duke of Mecklenburg-Strelitz
- House: Holstein-Gottorp-Romanov
- Father: Grand Duke Michael Pavlovich of Russia
- Mother: Princess Charlotte of Württemberg

Grand Duchess Catherine Mikhailovna of Russia (Russian: Великая Княжна Екатерина Михайловна) (28 August 1827 – 12 May 1894), was the third of five daughters of Grand Duke Michael Pavlovich of Russia (youngest son of Emperor Paul I) and Princess Charlotte of Württemberg (known as Grand Duchess Elena Pavlovna after marriage). She was also the wife of Duke Georg August of Mecklenburg-Strelitz.

She was a philanthropist and many of the organisations she supported and helped to create still operate today.

== Biography ==
=== Early life ===
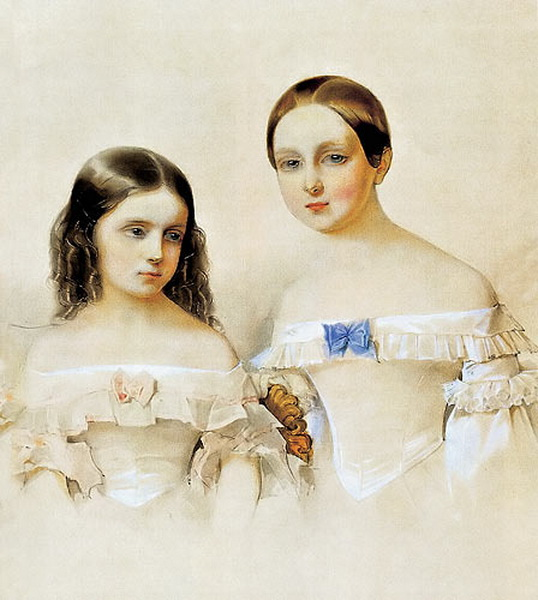
Catherine and her sister Maria c.1837

Catherine was born on 28 August 1827 in Saint Petersburg, Russian Empire, almost certainly in the recently completed Mikhailovsky Palace that was the primary residence of her parents. She was the younger sister of Grand Duchess Maria Mikhailovna of Russia and Grand Duchess Elizabeth Mikhailovna of Russia, as well as the older sister of Grand Duchess Alexandra Mikhailovna of Russia and Grand Duchess Anna Mikhailovna of Russia.

Her mother took a great interest in her daughters and was very involved in their childhood, raising them relatively strictly and personally selecting their teachers in subjects such as foreign languages, singing, and drawing. Anna and Alexandra died in childhood while Elizabeth and Maria died only a year apart in 1845 and 1846, respectively. This meant that for much of her life, her mother had only Catherine on whom to focus her attention.

Also in 1846, Catherine became 'Chief' of the Sergievsky Dragoon Regiment which would later receive her name, but the regiment disbanded in 1851. She received another regiment in 1856 which became known as "Her Imperial Majesty's Dragoon Regiment, Grand Duchess Ekaterina Mikhailovna."

In 1849, Catherine's father died suddenly at the age of 51 while in Warsaw, which spurred her mother to begin the charitable work that would be the legacy of both herself and Catherine.

=== Marriage and issue ===
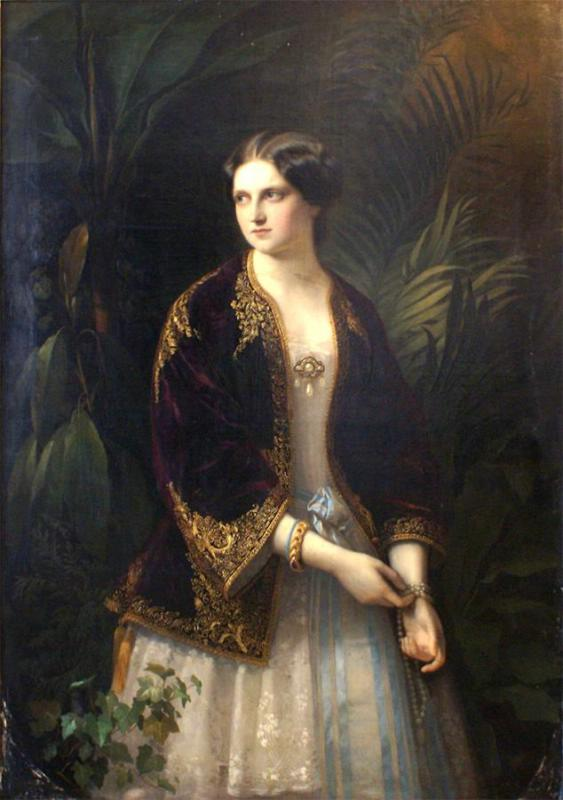
Grand Duchess Catherine Mikhailovna, 1850, by Carl Timoleon von Neff.

On 16 February 1851, Catherine married Duke Georg Alexander of Mecklenburg-Strelitz in St. Petersburg.

On 12 July 1854, Catherine gave birth to a son named Nikolaus (or Nikolai) who "died immediately by birth."

On 16 January 1857, the couple's only surviving daughter was born and named Elena, presumably for Catherine's mother. Elena would go on to marry Prince Albert of Saxe-Altenburg and become Duchess Helene of Mecklenburg-Strelitz. After her husband's death, she remarried, but had no issue from either husbands.

Catherine's third child, Duke Georg Alexander of Mecklenburg-Strelitz, was born on 6 June 1859 at the family's estate in Remplin, Germany. He would marry one of Catherine's ladies-in-waiting, Natalia Feodorovna Vanljarskaya, and have four children. Catherine severely disapproved of the marriage, and it became a point of contention between herself and her son until her death.

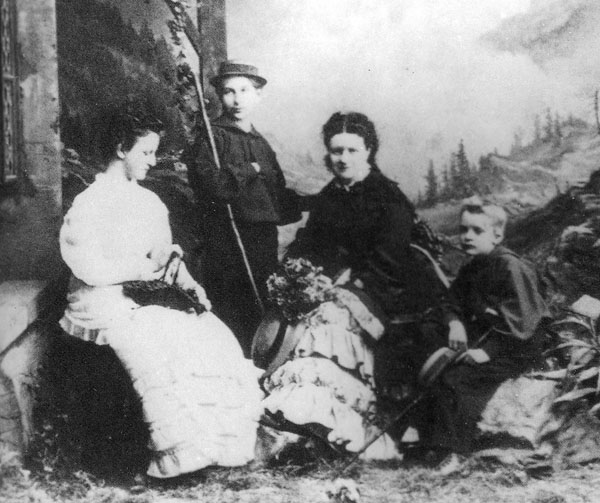
Catherine with her surviving children, 1870.

Another daughter was born sometime in 1861 named Maria-Frederica who died soon after her birth.

Finally on 17 June 1863, Catherine gave birth to her final child, Charles Michael, Duke of Mecklenburg, at Oranienbaum, Russia. He would never marry nor have issue, but lived much of his life in Russia and managed to flee shortly after being arrested following the February Revolution.

Her husband died in June 1876 at the age of 50, and Catherine would outlive him by 18 years.

=== Later life and extensive charitable works ===
Catherine enjoyed a high position in St. Petersburg society, having her own court, and was "a strict woman, well aware of herself and her rank." She was often seen in somewhat old-fashioned dresses containing much lace.

By 1870, she had been made chairwoman of the St. Petersburg Women's Patriotic Society, which she had been a member of since 1847 and began to devote more time to helping her mother with some of her foundations.

When her mother died in 1873, Catherine inherited the Mikhailovsky Palace which she used to continue many traditions begun by Elena, using the palace for various arts and handicrafts exhibitions. She also began to take much more of an interest in the work begun by her mother and the list of charities she was patroness to grew exponentially. A selection of these charities and organisations includes:

- the St. Helena School
- the Elisabeth Hospital for Young Children
- the Clinical Institute (now the Institute for Advanced Medical Studies)
- the Frebelev Society
- the Berlin Society of Art Lovers

She was also known to help those who applied to her for monetary assistance via petitions, which she accepted each year around the major holidays.

When Alexander II of Russia was assassinated in 1881, Catherine was asked by the mayor of St. Petersburg to help arrange a memorial to the Tsar. She accepted and even offered some of her own land adjacent to the Mikhailovsky Palace for it on the condition that the nearby trees were preserved as many of them had been there since the reign of Peter the Great.

=== Death and inheritance ===
At some point in either late 1893 or early 1894, Catherine became seriously ill with Influenza. While on her deathbed, she summoned Alexander III of Russia in order to approve the will she had had written. He inquired briefly about who had written it, but signed it directly and without first reading it.

When Catherine finally died on 12 May 1894, she was buried in the Saints Peter and Paul Cathedral, Saint Petersburg after a funeral procession from the Mikhailovsky Palace led by the Emperor himself.

After the funeral, her will was examined and two issues were discovered. Firstly, she had practically disinherited her son Georg on account of his marriage, but asked, "May God grant them happiness and prosperity." Secondly and most importantly, she had left the Mikhailovsky Palace to the princes of Mecklenburg-Strelitz (i.e. her daughter and youngest son) rather than the Imperial family. This was a problem as she did not technically own the palace, it had been effectively on loan to her father and then to her, but upon her death should have reverted to the Imperial family as her heirs were not members of the Russian Orthodox Church.

Sergei Witte recalled that, "The Emperor once said that it was very unpleasant for him that this historic palace, which belongs to the Imperial House, had passed, by some misunderstanding, into the hands of these princes." He did not consider attempting to overrule the will, however, on account of the facts that Catherine had been very well respected in society and the whole ordeal was really his own fault as he did sign the will without reviewing its contents.

== Awards ==
- Grand Cross of the Order of Saint Catherine

== Ancestry ==
Ancestors of Grand Duchess Catherine Mikhailovna of Russia

8. Peter III of Russia
4. Paul I of Russia
9. Catherine II of Russia
2. Grand Duke Michael Pavlovich of Russia
10. Frederick II Eugene, Duke of Württemberg
5. Duchess Sophie Dorothea of Württemberg
11. Princess Friederike of Brandenburg-Schwedt
1. Grand Duchess Catherine Mikhailovna of Russia
12. Frederick I of Württemberg
6. Prince Paul of Württemberg
13. Duchess Augusta of Brunswick-Wolfenbüttel
3. Princess Charlotte of Württemberg
14. Frederick, Duke of Saxe-Altenburg
7. Princess Charlotte of Saxe-Hildburghausen
15. Duchess Charlotte Georgine of Mecklenburg-Strelitz
