= Grand Duchess Olga of Russia =

Grand Duchess Olga of Russia may refer to:

== Grand Duchesses of Russia by birth ==
- Grand Duchess Olga Pavlovna of Russia (1792–1795), fifth daughter of Paul I of Russia
- Olga Nikolaevna of Russia (1822–1892), second daughter of Nicholas I of Russia; wife of Charles I of Württemberg
- Olga Constantinovna of Russia (1851–1926), eldest daughter of Grand Duke Constantine of Russia; wife of George I of Greece
- Grand Duchess Olga Alexandrovna of Russia (1882–1960), daughter of Alexander III of Russia; wife of Peter of Oldenburg & Nicholas Kulikovsky
- Grand Duchess Olga Nikolaevna of Russia (1895–1918), eldest daughter of Nicholas II of Russia and Alix of Hesse and by Rhine

== Grand Duchesses of Russia by marriage ==
- Grand Duchess Olga Feodorovna of Russia (1839–1891); wife of Grand Duke Michael Nikolaevich of Russia

== See also ==
- Olga of Kiev, sometimes known as "Princess Olga of Russia"
