= Grand Duchess Elizabeth Mikhailovna of Russia =

Duchess of Nassau from 1844 to 1845

Grand Duchess Elizabeth Mikhailovna
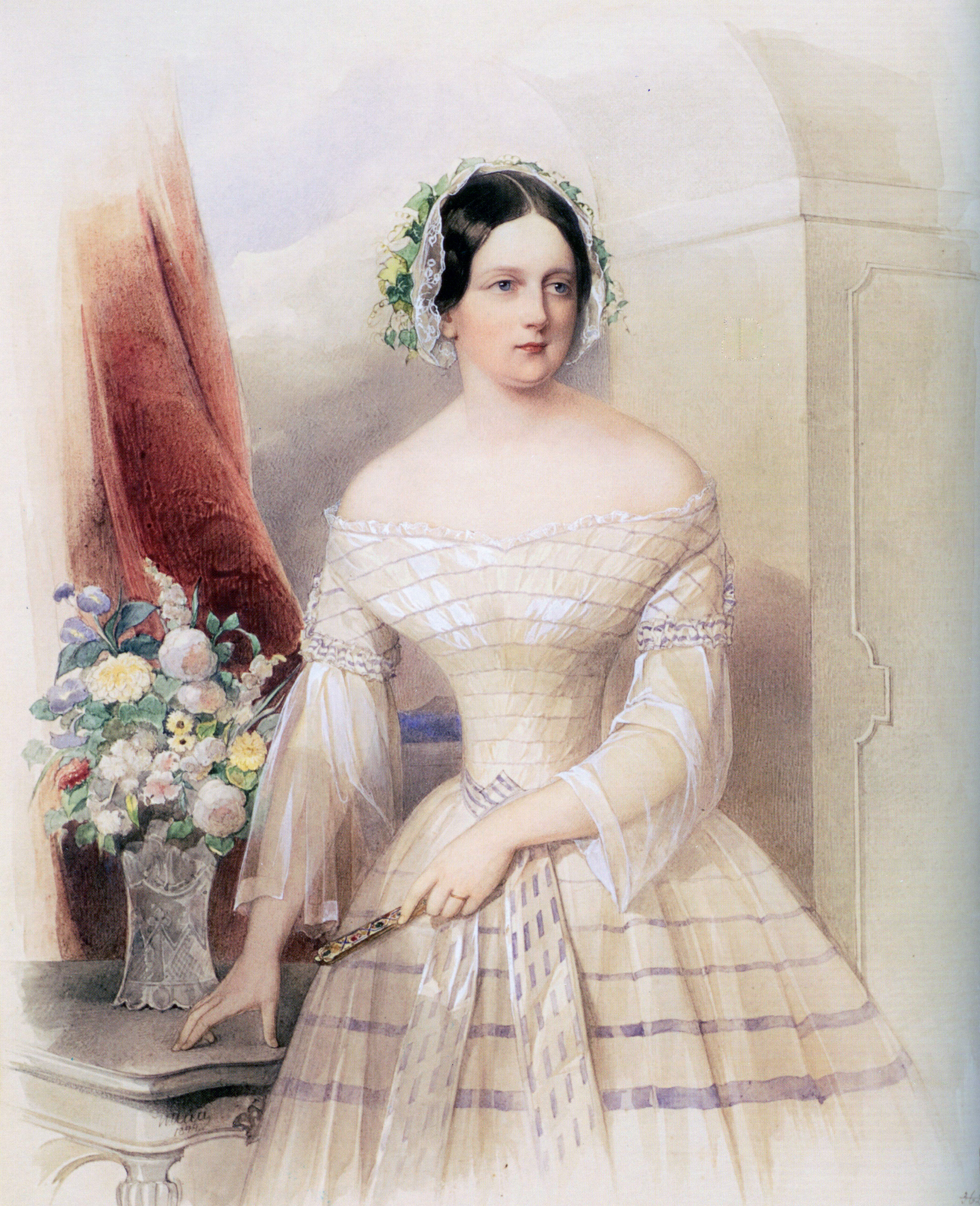
- Portrait by Woldemar Hau

Duchess consort of Nassau
- Tenure: 31 January 1844 – 28 January 1845
- Born: 26 May 1826; Moscow, Russian Empire
- Died: 28 January 1845 (aged 18); Wiesbaden, Duchy of Nassau
- Spouse: Adolphe, Duke of Nassau (m. 1844)
- House: Romanov
- Father: Grand Duke Michael Pavlovich of Russia
- Mother: Princess Charlotte of Württemberg

Grand Duchess Elizabeth Mikhailovna of Russia (26 May 1826 – 28 January 1845) was the second child and daughter of Grand Duke Mikhail Pavlovich of Russia and Princess Charlotte of Württemberg who took the name Elena Pavlovna upon her conversion to the Orthodox faith. Through her father, Elizabeth was a granddaughter of Tsar Paul I of Russia, and a niece of both Russian emperors Alexander I and Nicholas I.

== Biography ==
Elizabeth, nicknamed 'Lili' or 'Lili the fidget', was born in the Kremlin in Moscow and she was named after her aunt who had died ten days earlier, the Empress Elizabeth, wife of Emperor Alexander I and a close friend of her mother. She grew up with her other siblings in the Mikhailovsky Palace in Saint Petersburg. Elizabeth was said to be the prettiest among her sisters and, like her mother, Elena Pavlovna, she was graceful in manners and well-educated. Her mother paid great attention to the education of her daughters, and her father introduced military topics into their program, citing the fact that they were chiefs of military regiments. They learnt the signals on the bugle and drum, which made their father proud. Elizabeth also was highly favoured by her uncle, Emperor Nicholas I, who considered her as his favourite niece.

Her cousin, Grand Duchess Olga Nikolaevna described her as straightforward, hot-tempered, and boyish and described by the Empress as 'an honest person'.

A foreign contemporary described her as;

"The healthiest of the three sisters, the most beautiful, tall and slender. Hair shimmering with deep red tones, long light eyelashes and a charming face."

By the end of 1843, Adolf, Duke of Nassau was visiting St. Petersburg and met Elizabeth for the first time. Adolf's stepmother was Princess Pauline of Württemberg, Elizabeth's maternal aunt. Adolf and Elizabeth fell in love and they eventually got married on 31 January 1844 in St. Petersburg. Elizabeth was 17 years old and Adolf was 26. She was initially proposed to by his brother Maurice, but declined. Elizabeth was allowed to keep her orthodox faith, even after moving to Nassau.

After the wedding, the couple stayed in Russia for some time until they moved to Germany and took up residence in Castle Biebrich in Wiesbaden. Elizabeth, now Duchess of Nassau, was popular among the people.

She followed her mother's footsteps and used the income from Nassau on charity works and refused payments from the treasury. She had plans to open the first children's hospital in Wiesbaden, but was unable to. During the three week trip to Germany in the winter of 1844, she had caught a cold, which is believed to have developed into tuberculosis.

Sculpture of Elizabeth Mikhailovna at the St. Elizabeth Church in Wiesbaden

She and Adolf were happily married and the news that she was already pregnant with their first child brought great happiness to the couple. The pregnancy weakened her strength and come Christmas, she was so ill that she did not leave her room. On 28 January, Father John Bazarov was called to the dying Grand Duchess' bedside, she was drifting in and out of consciousness. In a moment, of consciousness, she asked about her child and was reassured she was healthy.

After only a year of marriage, Elizabeth died giving birth to a daughter, who also did not survive. Her cause of death was advanced tuberculosis. The grief-stricken Adolf ordered the construction of a Russian Orthodox church – the St. Elizabeth's Church in Neroberg Park, Wiesbaden – to house her remains. The location of the church on the hill was chosen by Adolf himself so that he could always have a view of the church from his residence. Elizabeth's sarcophagus can still be seen today inside the church.

The children's hospital she had planned, was opened in 1845 under the name 'Elizabeth'. In Saint Petersburg, her mother created the Elizabeth hospital for children in her honor, whose physician was her personal doctor she brought with her from St. Petersburg. A year and a half later, having lost another daughter, Elizabeth's sister, Maria, their mother opened orphanages in Moscow and Pavlosk, naming them after the sisters.

== Legacy ==
- Elizavetinskaya Street in Pavlosk named on 23 July 1840 by Grand Duke Mikhail Pavlovich who owned the street. At the same time, he named the streets Ekaterininskaya and Mariinskaya streets were named in honor of two of her sisters.
- Elizavetinskaya Children's Hospital was named in honor of the late Grand Duchess. Her mother was made its chief trustee, and after her death, Grand Duchess Catherine Mikhailovna took over the role.
- The Orphanage of Elizabeth and Maria founded by the Grand Duchess Elena Pavlovna in honor of her daughters Elizabeth and Maria.
- Russian Orthodox Church of St. Elizabeth in Wiesbaden was built by her husband using her dowry to house the remains of the Grand Duchess and her daughter.

== Ancestry ==
Ancestors of Grand Duchess Elizabeth Mikhailovna of Russia

8. Peter III of Russia
4. Paul I of Russia
9. Catherine II of Russia
2. Grand Duke Michael Pavlovich of Russia
10. Frederick II Eugene, Duke of Württemberg
5. Duchess Sophie Dorothea of Württemberg
11. Princess Friederike of Brandenburg-Schwedt
1. Grand Duchess Elizabeth Mikhailovna of Russia
12. Frederick I of Württemberg
6. Prince Paul of Württemberg
13. Duchess Augusta of Brunswick-Wolfenbüttel
3. Princess Charlotte of Württemberg
14. Frederick, Duke of Saxe-Altenburg
7. Princess Charlotte of Saxe-Hildburghausen
15. Duchess Charlotte Georgine of Mecklenburg-Strelitz

Grand Duchess Elizabeth Mikhailovna of Russia House of Romanov Born: 26 May 1826 Died: 28 January 1845
German royalty
Vacant Title last held by Princess Pauline of Württemberg	Duchess consort of Nassau; 31 January 1844 – 28 January 1845	Vacant Title next held by Princess Adelheid-Marie of Anhalt-Dessau
