= Princess Charlotte of Württemberg =

Grand Duchess Elena Pavlovna of Russia

Princess Charlotte
- Grand Duchess Elena Pavlovna of Russia
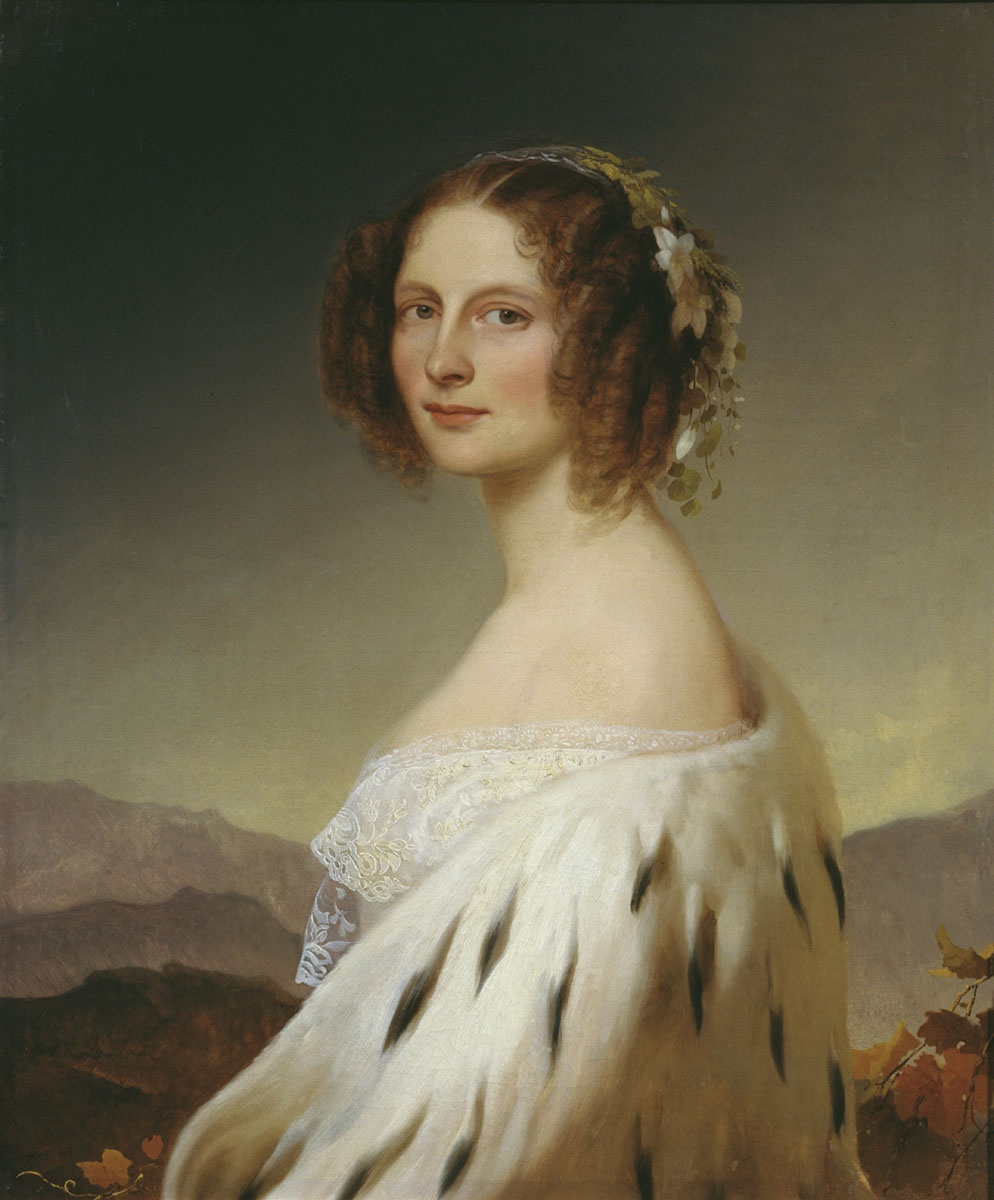
- Portrait by Christina Robertson, 1850
- Born: 9 January 1807; Stuttgart, Kingdom of Württemberg, Confederation of the Rhine
- Died: 2 February 1873 (aged 66); Saint Petersburg, Russian Empire
- Burial: Peter and Paul Cathedral, Saint Petersburg, Russian Empire
- Spouse: Grand Duke Michael Pavlovich of Russia (m. 1824; died 1849)
- Issue: Grand Duchess Maria; Elizabeth, Duchess of Nassau; Catherine, Duchess Georg of Mecklenburg-Strelitz; Grand Duchess Alexandra; Grand Duchess Anna
Names
- German: Friederike Charlotte Marie
- House: Württemberg
- Father: Prince Paul of Württemberg
- Mother: Princess Charlotte of Saxe-Hildburghausen

Princess Charlotte of Württemberg (9 January 1807 – 2 February [O.S. 21 January] 1873), later known as Grand Duchess Elena Pavlovna, was the wife of Grand Duke Michael Pavlovich of Russia, the youngest son of Paul I of Russia and Duchess Sophie Dorothea of Württemberg.

== Early life ==
She was born in Stuttgart, as Princess Charlotte of Württemberg, the eldest daughter of Prince Paul of Württemberg and of Princess Charlotte of Saxe-Hildburghausen. As a child, Charlotte lived in Paris with her father and her younger sister Pauline. Their home was quite modest by royal standards. In Paris, Charlotte came under the tutelage of several intellectuals.

== Marriage and issue ==
In 1822, she became engaged to Grand Duke Mikhail Pavlovich of Russia, her first cousin once removed (Mikhail's mother was her father's aunt). It was said that Charlotte was an exceptional girl, highly intelligent and mature for her age of 15. The Grand Duke was obviously impressed by her beauty and her poise, and during a reception held in her honor, she charmed all the guests with her conversations. On 17 December 1823, she was received into the Russian Orthodox Church and was given the name Elena Pavlovna. On 20 February 1824, the couple married in Saint Petersburg and settled in the Mikhailovsky Palace. When the Dowager Empress Maria Feodorovna died in 1828, the palace of Pavlovsk passed on to Mikhail and he and Elena visited it often. Their marriage was not a happy one: Mikhail's only passion was for the army, and he neglected Elena. Nevertheless, he and Elena had five daughters, only three of whom lived to adulthood:

- Grand Duchess Maria Mikhailovna of Russia (9 March 1825, Moscow – 19 November 1846, Vienna); died unmarried.
- Grand Duchess Elizabeth Mikhailovna of Russia (26 May 1826, Moscow – 28 January 1845, Wiesbaden); married Adolf, Duke of Nassau and died in childbirth.
- Grand Duchess Catherine Mikhailovna of Russia (28 August 1827 – 12 May 1894), married Duke Georg August of Mecklenburg-Strelitz
- Grand Duchess Alexandra Mikhailovna of Russia (28 January 1831, Moscow – 27 March 1832, Moscow), died in childhood
- Grand Duchess Anna Mikhailovna of Russia (27 October 1834, Moscow – 22 March 1836, Saint Petersburg), died in childhood

== Influence at court and in society ==
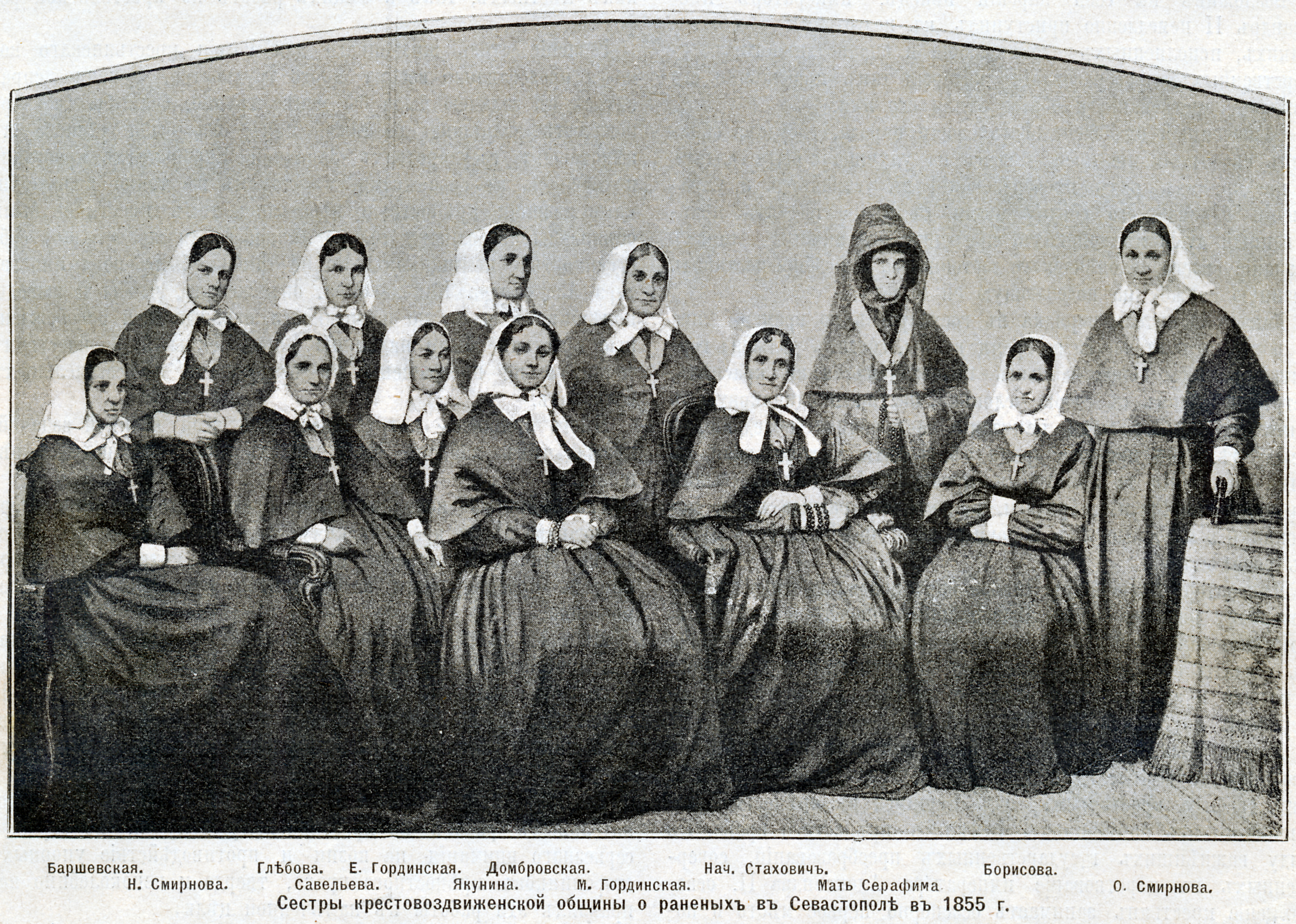
Russian Sisters of Mercy in the Crimea, 1854-1855

The Grand Duchess Elena Pavlovna became a close friend of her brother-in-law, Emperor Alexander I of Russia (r. 1801–1825) and of his wife, the Empress Elizabeth Alexeievna. She was also quick to befriend the shy Maria Alexandrovna, who married the then Tsarevich Alexander in 1841. After Elena Pavlovna's husband died in 1849, she became a patron of several charitable organizations and of the arts. She founded the Saint Petersburg Conservatory and co-founded in 1854 a group of nursing sisters, the Society of the Sisters of Mercy, which eventually became the forerunner of the Red Cross in Russia. During her time in Russia she became known as the "family intellectual", and contemporary eyewitnesses frequently drew comparisons between her character and that of Catherine the Great (r. 1762–1796).

Elena Pavlovna founded the Russian Musical Society in 1859 and was prominent for her liberal stance on the issue of serfdom. She directly influenced her nephew, Alexander II, to enact the emancipation reform of 1861, utilizing her private estates as early experimental testing grounds for peasant liberation while the Tsar resided alongside her during the drafting of the imperial manifestos. As a prominent patroness of the composer Anton Rubinstein (1829–1894), she commissioned several of his early operas, including Fomka the Fool (Russian: Фомка-дурачок, 1853), The Siberian Hunters (Russian: Сибирские охотники, 1852), and Vengeance (Russian: Месть, 1852/1853). Elena Pavlovna died on 21 January 1873 in Saint Petersburg at the age of 66.

== Ancestry ==
Ancestors of Princess Charlotte of Württemberg

8. Frederick II Eugene, Duke of Württemberg
4. Frederick I of Württemberg
9. Princess Friederike of Brandenburg-Schwedt
2. Prince Paul of Württemberg
10. Charles William Ferdinand, Duke of Brunswick
5. Duchess Augusta of Brunswick-Wolfenbüttel
11. Princess Augusta of Great Britain
1. Princess Charlotte of Württemberg
12. Ernest Frederick III, Duke of Saxe-Hildburghausen
6. Frederick, Duke of Saxe-Altenburg
13. Princess Ernestine of Saxe-Weimar-Eisenach
3. Princess Charlotte of Saxe-Hildburghausen
14. Charles II, Grand Duke of Mecklenburg-Strelitz
7. Duchess Charlotte Georgine of Mecklenburg-Strelitz
15. Princess Friederike of Hesse-Darmstadt

== Bibliography ==
- Lincoln, W. Bruce. The Romanovs: Autocrats of All the Russias. 1983
- Sebag Montefiore, Simon. The Romanovs: 1613-1918. 2016. Knopf Publishing Group.
- Taylor, Philip S., Anton Rubinstein: A Life in Music, Indianapolis, 2007
- Zeepvat, Charlotte. Romanov Autumn. 2001
