= Grand Duke Michael Pavlovich of Russia =

Russian grand duke (1798–1849)

Grand Duke Mikhail Pavlovich
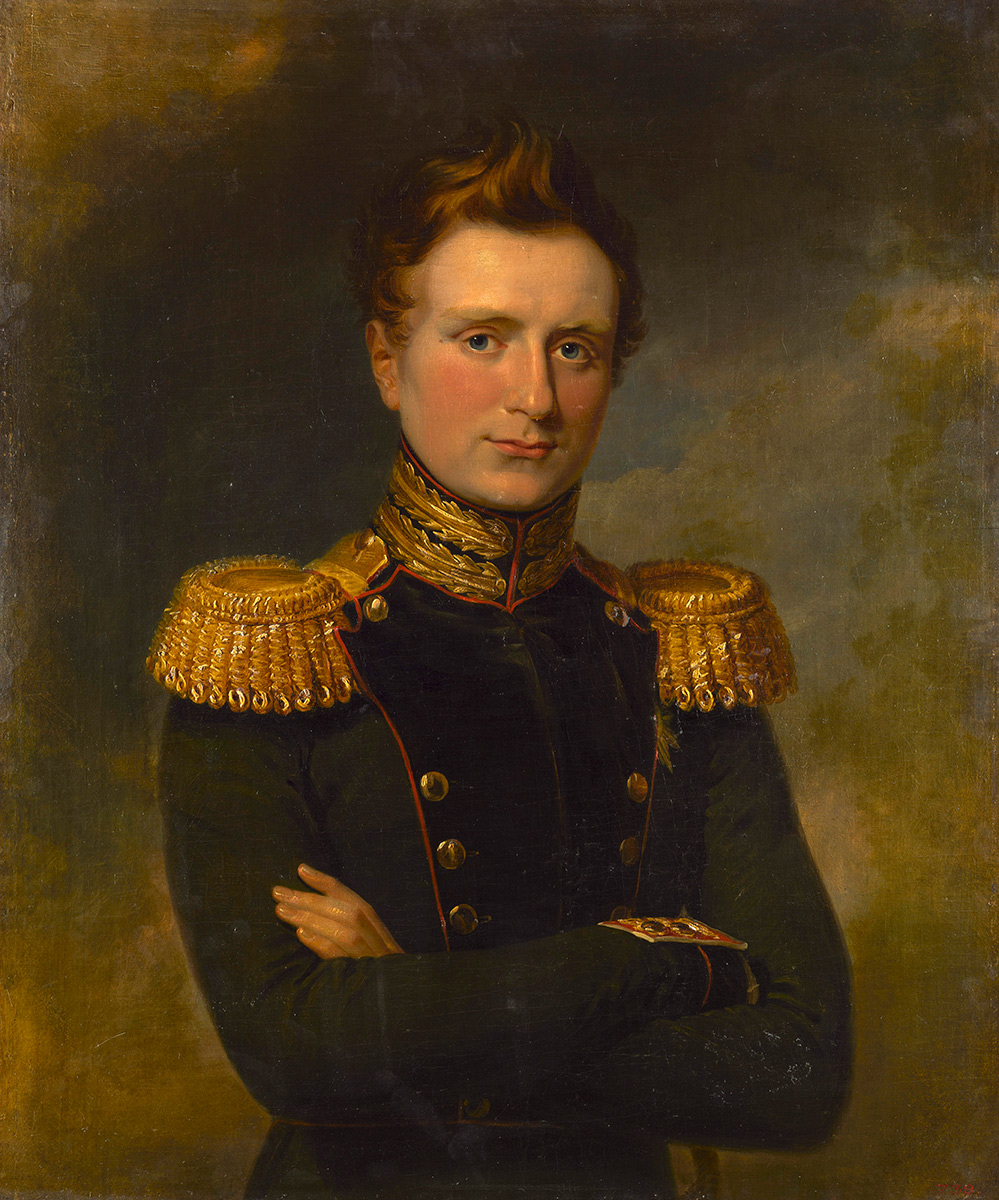
- Portrait by George Dawe, 1829
- Born: 8 February 1798; Winter Palace, St. Petersburg, Russian Empire
- Died: 9 September 1849 (aged 51); Warsaw, Congress Poland
- Burial: 16 September 1849; Peter and Paul Cathedral
- Spouse: Princess Charlotte of Württemberg (m. 1824)
- Issue Detail: Grand Duchess Maria Mikhailovna; Grand Duchess Elizaveta Mikhailovna; Grand Duchess Ekaterina Mikhailovna; Grand Duchess Alexandra Mikhailovna; Grand Duchess Anna Mikhailovna; Nadezhda Mikhailovna Yunina
- House: Holstein-Gottorp-Romanov
- Father: Paul I of Russia
- Mother: Sophie Dorothea of Württemberg

Grand Duke Mikhail Pavlovich of Russia (Russian: Михаил Павлович; 8 February [O.S. 28 January] 1798 – 9 September [O.S. 28 August] 1849) was a Russian grand duke, the tenth child and fourth son of Paul I of Russia and his second wife, Sophie Dorothea of Württemberg, who took the name Maria Feodorovna. He was the younger brother of two Tsars, Alexander I and Nicholas I, and the disputed Tsar Konstantin I.

== Early life ==
Grand Duke Mikhail Pavlovich was born on 8 February 1798, in the Winter Palace in Russia. He was the youngest child and son of Tsar Paul I of Russia and his wife, Maria Feodorovna (born Sophie Dorothea of Württemberg).

Mikhail was the only one of his siblings to be 'born in the purple', that is, born whilst his father was Tsar. His godparents were his older brother, Alexander, and his sister, Alexandra, who stood in for their grandmother Princess Friederike of Brandenburg-Schwedt (who died a month later).

Mikhail and his youngest siblings were brought up in a strict environment, which corporal punishment played a big part. He was tutored by General I. M. Lamzdorf, but was primarily taught by his mother Maria Feodorovna, who taught her sons science in an attempt to persuade them from building military careers. Ultimately, this would be of no use, as Mikhail and his brother Nicholas I had a penchant for all things military. At the age of sixteen, Mikhail took part in the campaign against Napoleon.

Mikhail took part in suppressing the Decembrist revolt following the sudden death of Alexander I. When the news reached him, Mikhail was in Warsaw. The next day he left for Saint Petersburg with a letter from Grand Duke Konstantin, renouncing his right to the throne. Upon his arrival, he learnt that the oath of allegiance to Konstantin had already been sworn. He returned to Warsaw and attempted to convince his brother to come to the capital to no avail. Returning early on 14 December, he found that ranks of the artillery had sworn the oath to Nicholas I, causing those sworn to Konstantin to mount a coup d'état. The coup was crushed by 3 January. Those who took part were imprisoned, sentenced to death, or exiled to Siberia. The Grand Duke was a member of the commission of inquiry into the uprising, and argued for Wilhelm Küchelbecker, who was sentenced to death for attempting to kill the grand duke, to be commuted to imprisonment and hard labour, which was successful.

Between 1828 and 1831, he fought in the Russo-Turkish War as Commander of the Guards Corps and in the November Uprising. As a result of his assault on Warsaw, he was awarded the rank of Adjutant general.

== Marriage and family ==
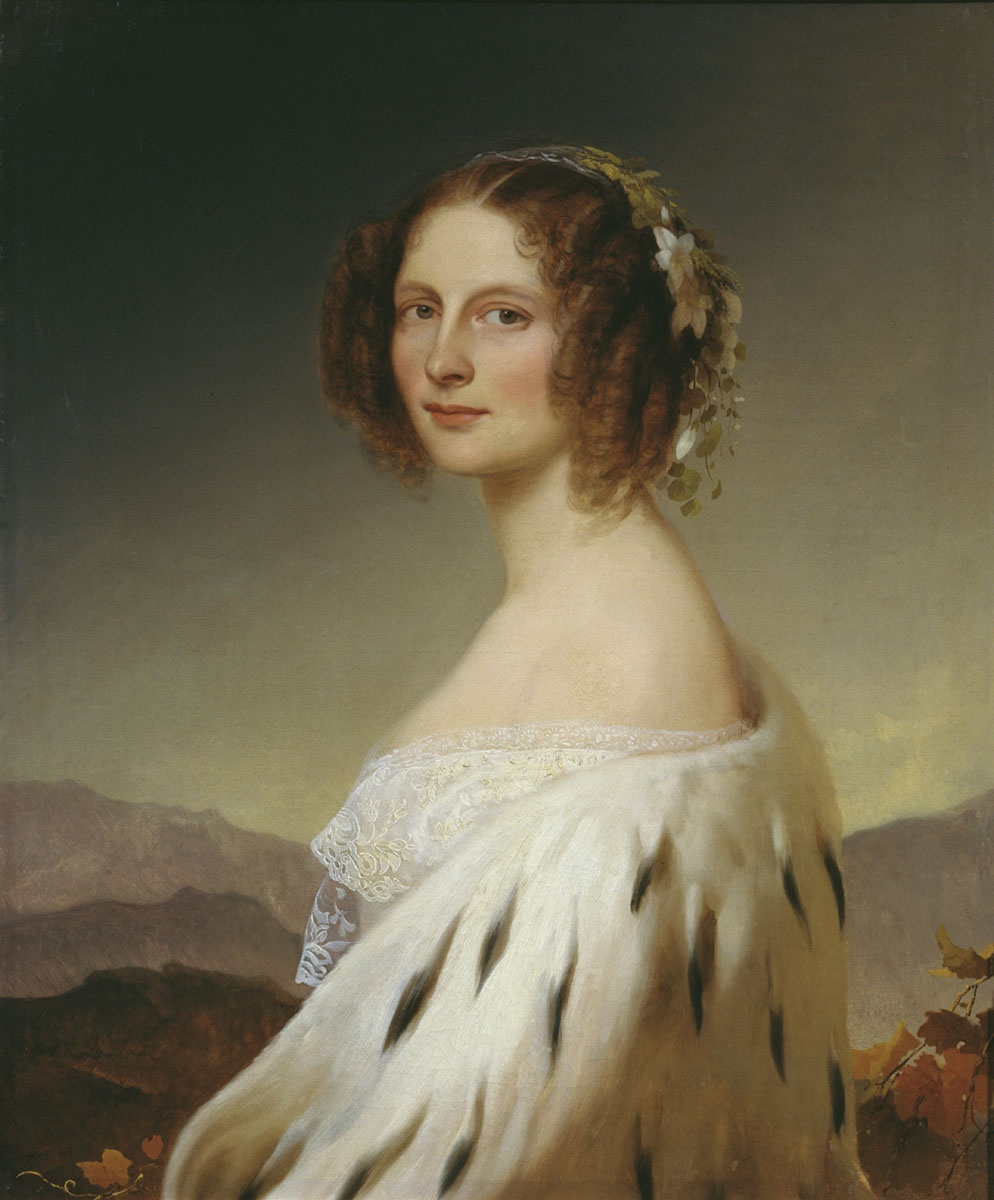
Elena Pavlovna in middle age.

Mikhail remained unmarried until the age of 26. Empress Maria Feodorovna found him a wife in Princess Charlotte of Württemberg (1807–1873), daughter of Prince Paul of Württemberg and Princess Charlotte of Saxe-Hildburghausen, and was the granddaughter of the Empress' brother. In 1822, Mikhail travelled to Stuttgart to get to know the princess, who was described by many as charming in every way. By all accounts, Mikhail was not fond of his fiancée, most likely due to the influence of his brother Konstantin and his hatred of German princesses after his failed marriage with Princess Juliane of Saxe-Coburg-Saalfeld.

Regardless of his personal opinion, he obeyed his mother's wishes and married Charlotte, who took the name Elena Pavlovna, in St. Petersburg, on 19 February 1824.

Relations between the couple did not become warmer. Mikhail's inattention to his wife, whom he avoided at all costs, shocked even Konstantin, who wrote "The position (of Elena Pavlovna) is insulting to female pride and to the delicacy that is generally characteristic of women. This is a lost woman if the deplorable situation in which she is not changed."

His wife tried to adapt to her husband's tastes but found it difficult to restrain herself on matters of principle. She wished Mikhail would play a more serious role in state affairs given his position and strong relationships with both Nicholas and Konstantin, but he remained devoted to the army. The Grand Duke was a favourite amongst the Imperial Family. A kind man in essence, he was not known to be a pleasant communicator, and was often perceived as 'ill-mannered'. Despite his opinions of his wife, he resigned himself to marriage and "forgave her that she was chosen to be his wife."

The couple would have five children, all daughters, four of which would predecease them, including two who died in infancy:

- Grand Duchess Maria Mikhailovna of Russia (9 March 1825, Moscow – 19 November 1846, Vienna); died unmarried.
- Grand Duchess Elizaveta Mikhailovna of Russia (26 May 1826, Moscow – 28 January 1845, Wiesbaden); married Adolf, Duke of Nassau, and died in childbirth.
- Grand Duchess Ekaterina Mikhailovna of Russia (28 August 1827 – 12 May 1894); married Duke Georg August of Mecklenburg-Strelitz.
- Grand Duchess Alexandra Mikhailovna of Russia (28 January 1831, Moscow – 27 March 1832, Moscow); died in infancy.
- Grand Duchess Anna Mikhailovna of Russia (27 October 1834, Moscow – 22 March 1836, Saint Petersburg); died in infancy.

Michael had a daughter with a mistress, Karolina Karlovna Stieglitz:

- Nadezhda Mikhailovna Yunina (1 December 1843 – 9 July 1908) who was adopted by Alexander von Stieglitz and his wife. She would go on to marry Alexander Polovtsov and have issue, including Peter Polovtsov. Nadezhda and Alexander Polovstov were also great-grandparents of Dimitri Obolensky.

Through his daughter Ekaterina, Mikhail is the third great-grandfather of Duke Georg Borwin of Mecklenburg who is the current head of the House of Mecklenburg-Strelitz.

== Mikhailovsky Palace ==
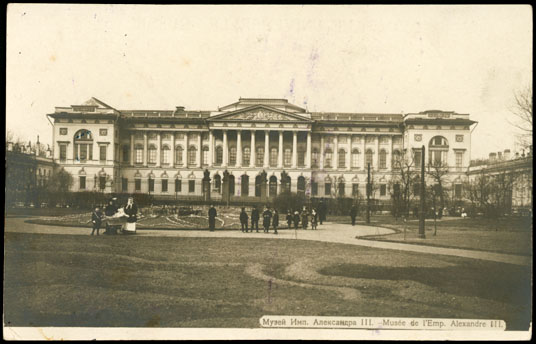
Former Mikhailovsky Palace pictured in a postcard from the beginning of the 20th century

Since his birth, the Grand Duke's father Paul I had been setting aside money to fund a palace fit for a son born to a reigning tsar. Paul I didn't manage to finish building the palace before he was assassinated in 1801 when Mikhail was three. The palace was then gifted to him by Alexander I.

The Mikhailovsky Palace was built by Carlo Rossi between 1819 and 1825, where Mikhail and his family would live. Upon the death of Dowager Empress Maria Feodorovna, the Pavlovsk Palace was bequeathed to Mikhail. He and his wife visited the palace often. After his death, the Mikhailovsky Palace was sold to the treasury, and is now owned by the Russian Museum.

== Illness and death ==
Though the Grand Duke appeared strong, he was not particularly healthy. In 1819, he developed a serious illness which he was treated for in the hot springs of Karlovy Vary. In 1837, he was treated for several months at European resorts; regardless, he still suffered. Mikhail often laughed at his doctor's recommendations and didn't always follow them. Nicholas I wrote: "The imminent arrival of Mikhail Pavlovich, instead of joy, is rather in grief for us, for he returns without finishing his treatment, which he will have to start again, if, as it should be believed, he does not change his way of life and bad habits here."

The death of his daughter, Elizaveta, in 1845, during childbirth, was a shock to the family. The following year, his eldest daughter, Maria, died, aged 21, in his arms whilst in Vienna after suffering from ill health her entire life. Mikhail began to suffer nose bleeds, and had a nervous breakdown three years later.

Despite his declining health, the Grand Duke insisted on travelling to Warsaw in July 1849 to attend to his guards and grenadier corps. During an inspection, his hand began to turn numb and he was rushed to the Belvedere palace. For two and a half weeks Mikhail was paralyzed and fought for his life. His wife and daughter, Ekaterina arrived in Warsaw and spent his last days at his bedside. Grand Duke Mikhail Pavlovich died on 9 September 1849.

The body of the Grand Duke was taken by steamer from Stettin to St. Petersburg for his burial at the Peter and Paul Cathedral on 16 September. The army and guards wore mourning clothes for three months, and the Imperial Family mourned for a whole year. His death seemed to have a great impact on Nicholas I, who easily tired, and turned grey.

== Ancestry ==
Ancestors of Grand Duke Michael Pavlovich of Russia

8. Charles Frederick, Duke of Holstein-Gottorp
4. Peter III of Russia
9. Grand Duchess Anna Petrovna of Russia
2. Paul I of Russia
10. Christian August, Prince of Anhalt-Zerbst
5. Catherine II of Russia
11. Princess Johanna Elisabeth of Holstein-Gottorp
1. Grand Duke Michael Pavlovich of Russia
12. Charles Alexander, Duke of Württemberg
6. Frederick II Eugene, Duke of Württemberg
13. Princess Marie Auguste of Thurn and Taxis
3. Duchess Sophie Dorothea of Württemberg
14. Frederick William, Margrave of Brandenburg-Schwedt
7. Princess Friederike of Brandenburg-Schwedt
15. Princess Sophia Dorothea of Prussia
