= Grand Duchess Olga Pavlovna of Russia =

Grand Duchess of Russia

Grand Duchess Olga Pavlovna
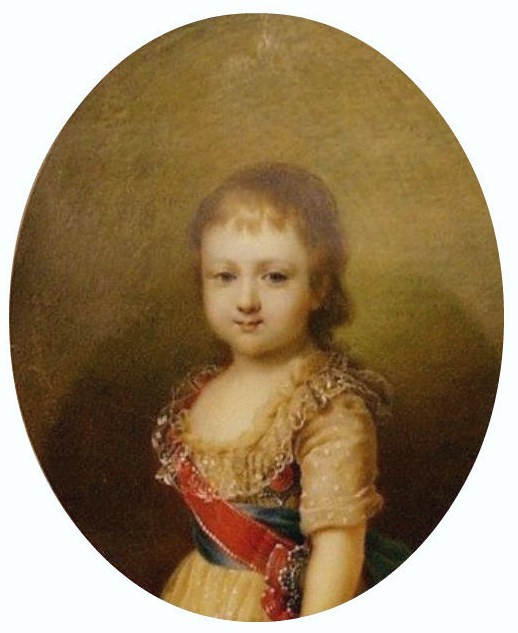
- Born: 22 July [O.S. 11 July] 1792; Saint Petersburg, Russian Empire
- Died: 26 January [O.S. 15] 1795 (aged 2); Saint Petersburg, Russian Empire
- Burial: Annunciation Church, Alexander Nevsky Monastery
- House: Holstein-Gottorp-Romanov
- Father: Paul Petrovich, Tsarevich of Russia
- Mother: Sophie Dorothea of Württemberg

Grand Duchess Olga Pavlovna of Russia (Russian: Ольга Павловна; 22 July [O.S. 11 July] 1792 – 26 January [O.S. 15 January] 1795) was a Grand Duchess of Russia as the second youngest daughter and seventh child of the Tsesarevich of Russia and Sophie Dorothea of Württemberg.

== Birth and christening ==
The Grand Duchess Olga was born as her parents' fifth daughter and seventh child. Her birth was not greeted with much happiness by her paternal grandmother, Catherine the Great, who stated that "A lot of girls, all married will not tell anyone". She later wrote:

The Grand Duchess has treated us (nous a regalé) with a fifth daughter, whose shoulders are nearly as wide as mine. Since the Grand Duchess was in labour for two days and finally gave birth on July 11, the feast day of Saint Olga of Kiev, who was baptized in Constantinople in the year 956, I said, "Well, we will have two holidays instead of one" and so she was baptised Olga

The little Grand Duchess was baptised on 29 July [O.S. 18 July] 1792 and, as it was customary, she received the Great Cross of the Order of Saint Catherine.

== Death ==
The almost-three-year-old Grand Duchess died on 26 January [O.S. 15] 1795. A letter to Catherine the Great stated:

The 13th Grand Duchess, Olga, died. And imagine why? For eighteen weeks, she revealed a hunger and she constantly asked to eat, because she grew too great for her two and a half years, at that time many molars came at once, and after sixteen weeks of suffering and a slow debilitating fever occurred daily, she died between seven and eight o'clock in the evening ...

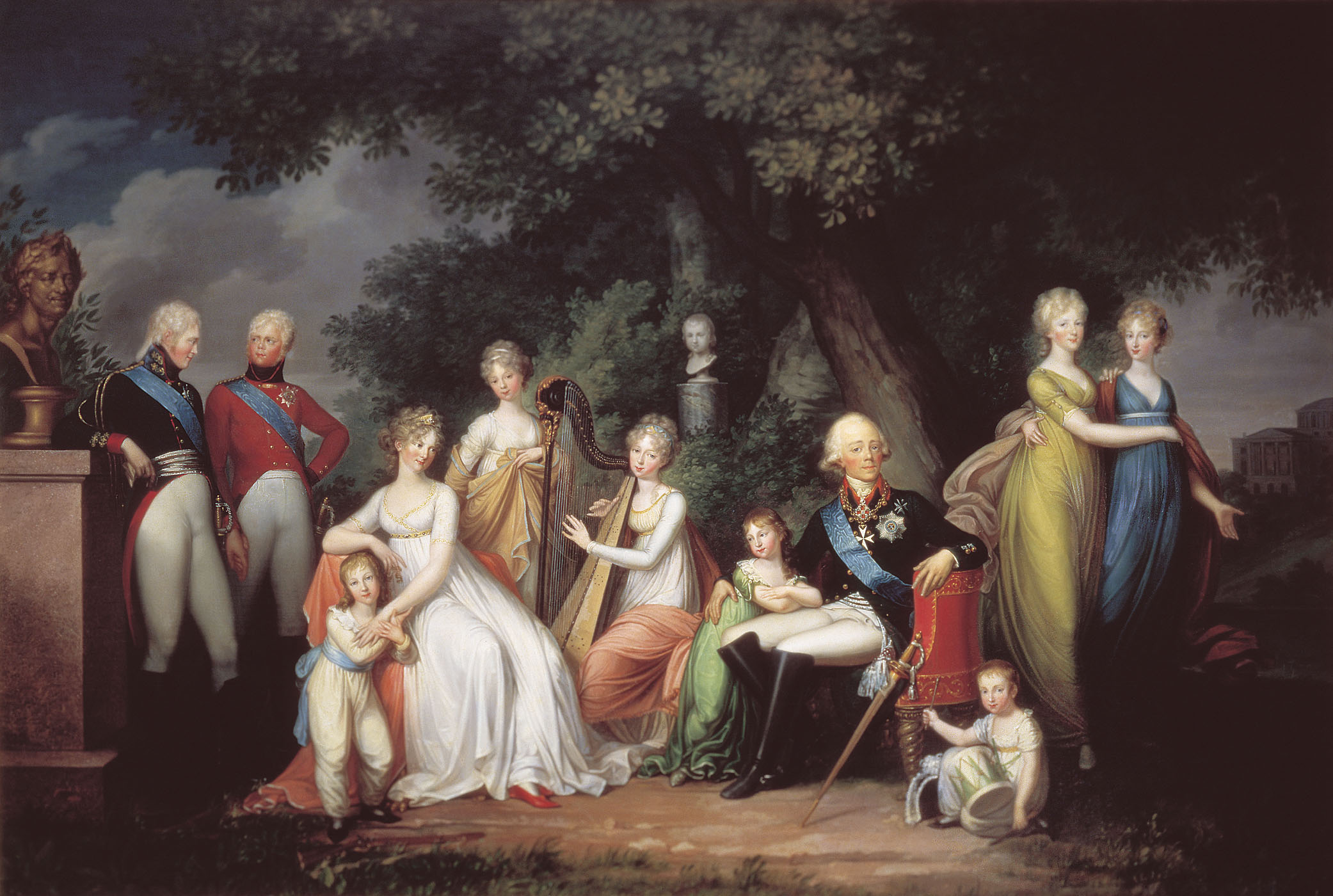
The family of Tsar Paul I, by Gerhard von Kügelgen, 1800.

The same year, Gavrila Derzhavin dedicated a poem to her death, entitled "On the death of Grand Duchess Olga Pavlovna", just as he had dedicated a poem to her when she was born. Out of the ten children born to Paul and Sophia, Olga was the only one that died during her childhood years. The funeral was held at the Annunciation Church of the Alexander Nevsky Monastery, Olga's burial place. The Empress herself was at the funeral, dressed in a white dress, with gray hair disheveled, pale and silent. In 1800, when Olga would have been eight, Gerhard von Kügelgen painted a portrait of Paul I's family. Behind the family, a bust of Olga stood high in front of a forest.

== Ancestry ==
Ancestors of Grand Duchess Olga Pavlovna of Russia

8. Charles Frederick, Duke of Holstein-Gottorp
4. Peter III of Russia
9. Grand Duchess Anna Petrovna of Russia
2. Paul I of Russia
10. Christian August, Prince of Anhalt-Zerbst
5. Catherine II of Russia
11. Princess Johanna Elisabeth of Holstein-Gottorp
1. Grand Duchess Olga Pavlovna of Russia
12. Charles Alexander, Duke of Württemberg
6. Frederick II Eugene, Duke of Württemberg
13. Princess Marie Auguste of Thurn and Taxis
3. Duchess Sophie Dorothea of Württemberg
14. Frederick William, Margrave of Brandenburg-Schwedt
7. Princess Friederike of Brandenburg-Schwedt
15. Princess Sophia Dorothea of Prussia

== Bibliography ==
- Eugene P. Karnovich (1990). Hungarian Palatine Alexandra Pavlovna: The wonderful and mysterious personality 17th and 19th centuries (in Russian). Smart.
- Albina Danilova (2004). Five princesses: A daughter of Paul I (in Russian).
