= Maria Feodorovna (Sophie Dorothea of Württemberg) =

Empress of Russia from 1796 to 1801

Mariya Feodorovna
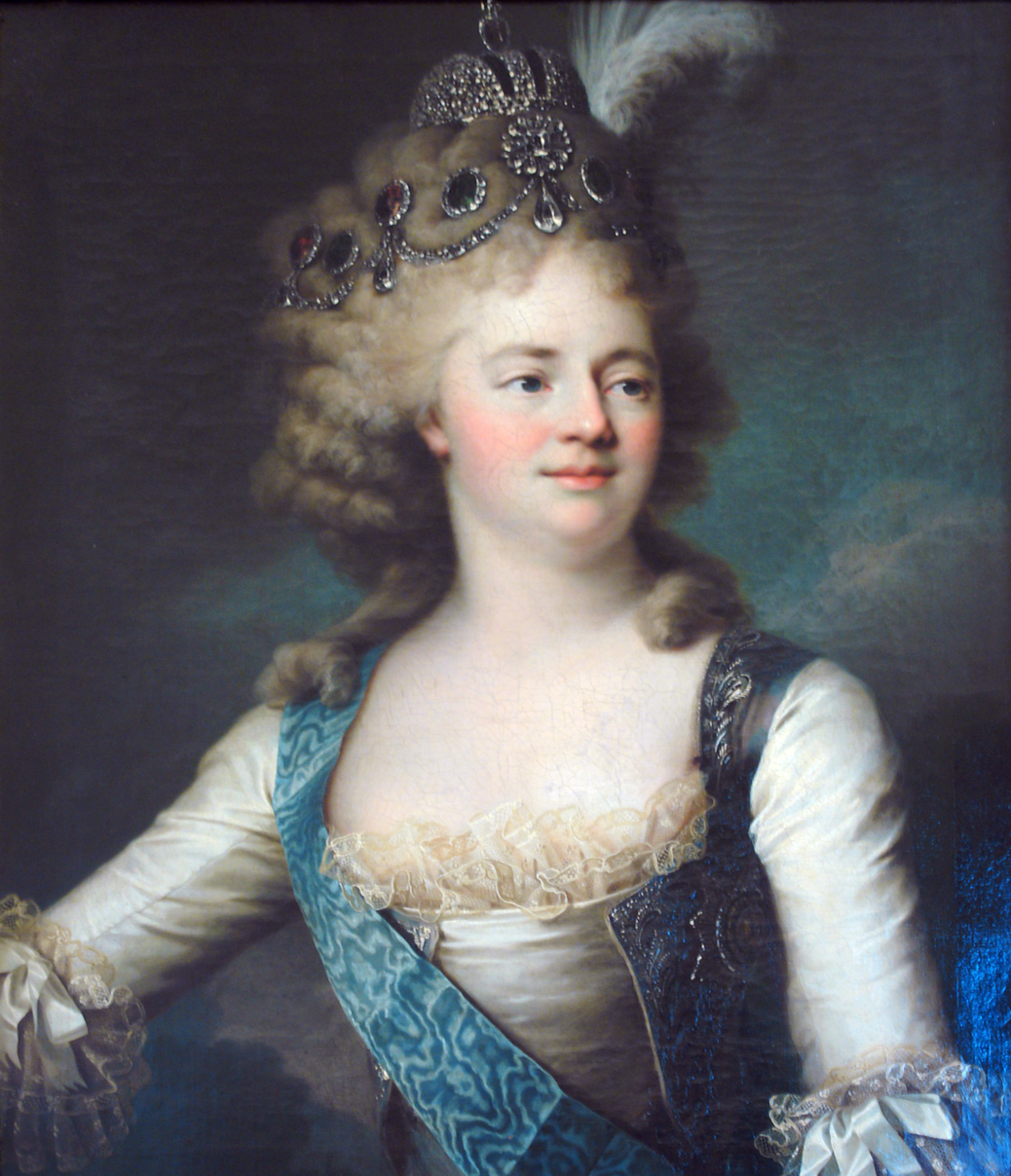
- Portrait by Jean-Louis Voille, c. 1790–99

Empress consort of Russia
- Tenure: 17 November 1796 – 23 March 1801
- Coronation: 5 April 1797
- Born: Duchess Sophie Dorothee of Württemberg; 25 October 1759; Stettin, Kingdom of Prussia (today Szczecin, Poland)
- Died: 5 November 1828 (aged 69); Winter Palace, Saint Petersburg, Russian Empire
- Burial: Peter and Paul Cathedral
- Spouse: Paul I of Russia (m. 1776; died 1801)
- Issue: Alexander I of Russia; Grand Duke Konstantin Pavlovich; Alexandra, Archduchess Joseph of Austria and Palatina of Hungary; Elena Pavlovna, Hereditary Princess of Mecklenburg-Schwerin; Maria Pavlovna, Grand Duchess of Saxe-Weimar-Eisenach; Catherine Pavlovna, Queen of Württemberg; Grand Duchess Olga Pavlovna; Anna Pavlovna, Queen of the Netherlands; Nicholas I of Russia; Grand Duke Michael Pavlovich
Names
- Sophie Marie Dorothee Auguste Luise later Mariya Feodorovna
- House: Württemberg
- Father: Frederick II Eugene, Duke of Württemberg
- Mother: Princess Friederike of Brandenburg-Schwedt

Mariya Feodorovna (Russian: Мария Фёдоровна; 25 October 1759 – 5 November [O.S. 24 October] 1828), born Duchess Sophie Dorothee of Württemberg (Sophie Marie Dorothee Auguste Luise), became Empress of Russia as the second wife of Emperor Paul I. She founded the Office of the Institutions of Empress Maria.

Daughter of Duke Frederick Eugene of Württemberg and Princess Friederike of Brandenburg-Schwedt, Sophie Dorothea belonged to a junior branch of the House of Württemberg and grew up in Montbéliard, receiving an excellent education for her time. After Grand Duke Paul (the future Paul I of Russia) became a widower in 1776, King Frederick II of Prussia (Sophie Dorothea's maternal great-uncle) and Empress Catherine II of Russia chose Sophie Dorothee as the ideal candidate to become Paul's second wife. In spite of her fiancé's difficult character, she developed a long, peaceful relationship with Paul and converted to the Russian Orthodox Church in 1776, adopting the name Mariya Feodorovna. During the long reign (1762–1796) of her mother-in-law, she sided with her husband and lost the initial affection the reigning Empress had for her. The couple were completely excluded from any political influence, as mother and son mistrusted each other. They were forced to live in isolation at Gatchina Palace, where they had many children together.

After her husband ascended the Russian throne in 1796, Mariya Feodorovna had a considerable and beneficial influence during his four-year reign. On the night of Paul I's assassination (23 March [O.S. 11 March] 1801), she thought to imitate her mother-in-law's example and claim the throne, but her son, the future Emperor Alexander I, dissuaded her. She instead instituted the precedence whereby the Empress dowager out-ranked the reigning monarch's wife, a system unique to the Russian court. Clever, purposeful and energetic, Maria Feodorovna founded and managed all the Russian Empire's charitable establishments, re-modelled the palaces of Gatchina and Pavlovsk, and encouraged foreign links directed against Napoleon I of France. She often gave political counsel to her children, who held her in great respect. The imperial family deeply mourned her death, and her successors regarded her as a role model.

== Childhood ==
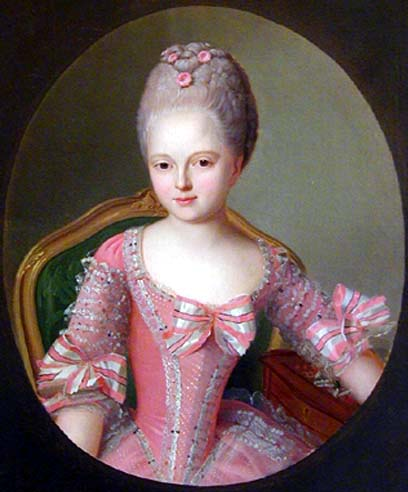
Young Sophie Dorothee in 1770.

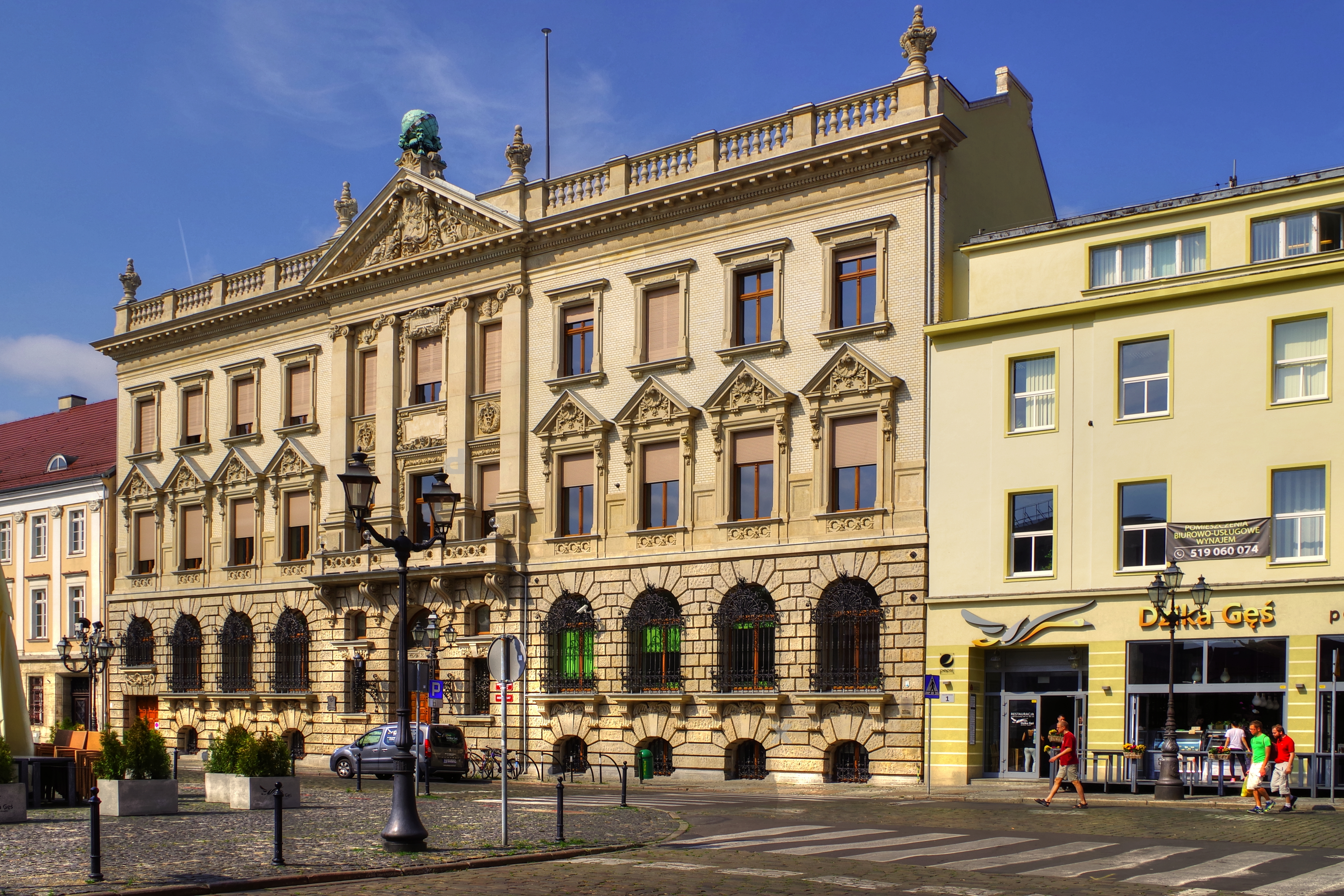
Grumbkow's Palace in Szczecin, where Maria Feodorovna was born.

Sophie Marie Dorothee Auguste Luise was born on 25 October 1759 in Stettin, Kingdom of Prussia (now Poland). She was the eldest daughter of the eight children born from Frederick II Eugene, Duke of Württemberg, and Princess Friederike of Brandenburg-Schwedt, niece of King Frederick II of Prussia. In 1769, her family took up residence in the ancestral castle at Montbéliard, then an exclave of the Duchy of Württemberg, today part of Franche-Comté. The family's summer residence was situated at Étupes.

Montbéliard not only was the seat of the junior branch of the House of Württemberg, but a cultural center frequented by many intellectual and political figures. Sophie Dorothea's education was better than average, to the point that she cultivated her skills with great enthusiasm. By the age of 16, she was well-versed in mathematics and architecture, as well as fluent in German, French, Italian, and Latin. She was brought up according to French etiquette as custom of that era, but with German bourgeois simplicity. She was known to be thoughtful, organized, strong-willed, constant, and tender.

In 1773, Sophie Dorothea was among the group of German princesses considered as possible wives of the heir to the Russian throne, the future Tsar Paul I. However, Sophie was not yet 14 years old at the time and thus Wilhelmina Louisa of Hesse-Darmstadt, a princess of a more appropriate age, was chosen instead. At the age of 16, Sophie Dorothea became tall, buxom and rosy-cheeked with a sunny disposition, although extremely shortsighted and inclined to be stout. She was engaged to Prince Louis of Hesse, the brother of the Tsarevich's first wife.

== Grand Duchess ==
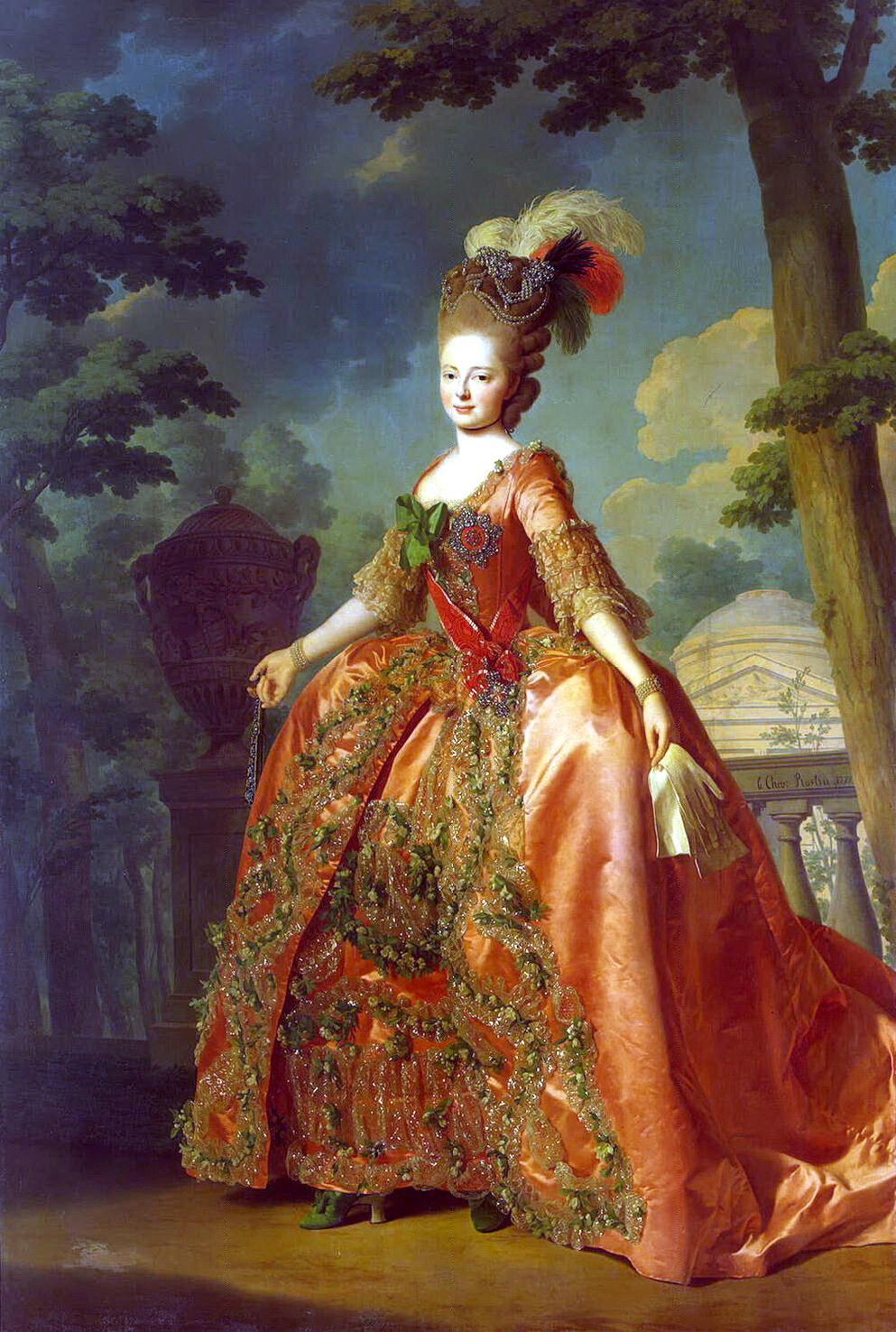
Portrait of Mariya Feodorovna by Alexander Roslin.

Portrait of Empress Ekaterina II, Mariya Feodorovna's mother-in-law whom she both admired and resented.

=== Engagement ===
After the Tsarevich became a widower in 1776, Frederick II of Prussia proposed his grandniece as the ideal candidate to be Paul's second wife. Russian Empress, Catherine II, was delighted with the idea: The Princess of Württemberg shared with her not only a similar education, but also the same original name and place of birth. When her mother lamented the unfortunate destiny of some Russian sovereigns, a pleased Sophie Dorothea replied that her only concern was to make her way in her new country quickly and successfully. Her former fiancé received a monetary compensation when the engagement was broken.

Sophie and Paul met for the first time at a state dinner given in honour of his arrival in Berlin. Having learned that her fiancé's tastes were serious, she spoke about geometry during their first interview. The next day, she wrote a glowing letter to a friend in which she declared that "I am more than content. The Grand Duke could not be more kind. I pride myself on the fact that my dear bridegroom loves me a great deal, and this makes me very, very fortunate." Paul was as happy with the young princess as she was with him and wrote to his mother that: "I found my intended to be such as I could have dreamed of. She is shapely, intelligent, quick-witted, and not at all shy."

=== First years ===
By early fall, Sophie fell in love with her future husband. "I cannot go to bed, my dear and adored Prince, without telling you once again that I love and adore you madly," she wrote to Paul. Soon after arriving at St Petersburg, she converted to the Russian Orthodox Church, took the name "Maria Feodorovna," and was granted the title Grand Duchess of Russia, with the style Imperial Highness. The wedding took place on 26 September 1776. Despite Paul's difficult and often tyrannical character, Maria Feodorovna never changed her feelings. Her even temper and patience were instrumental in knowing how to deal with a difficult husband and moderate the extreme elements in his character. She wrote to a friend: "My dear husband is a perfect angel and I love him to distraction."

As Grand Duchess, Maria Feodorovna possessed such parsimony that she was prepared to spend the whole day in full dress without fatigue and implacably imposed the same burden on her entourage. She didn't hesitate to take over the clothes of her husband's first wife and dispute with her ladies-in-waiting the defunct Natalia's slippers. At the beginning, Catherine II was enchanted with her daughter-in-law, about whom she wrote to a friend: "I confess to you that I am infatuated with this charming Princess, but literally infatuated. She is precisely what one would have wished: the figure of a nymph, a lily and rose complexion, the loveliest skin in the world, tall and well built; she is grateful; sweetness, kindnesses and innocence are reflected in her face."

However, the relationship between the two women quickly turned sour: Maria Feodorovna sided with her neglected husband in the family's acrimony and despite her good intentions to ease the difficult situation, meddling only aggravated their differences. In December 1777, she gave birth to the first of her ten children, future Tsar Alexander I. Just three months later, Catherine II took the newborn to raise him without interference from the parents. When a second son was born in April 1779, she did the same thing. This caused bitter animosity with Maria, who was only allowed weekly visits with Paul. For the next four years, the couple didn't have any more children. Deprived of her sons, Maria occupied herself by decorating Pavlovsk Palace, Catherine's gift to celebrate the birth of her first grandson.

=== European tour ===
Tired of being excluded in political affairs, Paul and Maria asked Catherine for permission to travel abroad to Western Europe. In September 1781, under the pseudonyms of "the Count and Countess Severny", the Tsarevich and his wife set off on a journey that lasted fourteen months and took them to Poland, Austria, Italy, France, Belgium, the Netherlands, and Germany. Paris made a special impression on the couple, who visited King Louis XVI and Queen Marie Antoinette. While Louis got along well with Paul, Marie Antoinette felt intimidated and nervous when she met Maria, a known intellectual who exhibited confidence. The conversation would turn lively later and the queen gave the grand duchess a toilette set with the Württemberg arms printed on it. In Austria, Holy Roman Emperor Joseph II compared Maria with her husband and found her superior.

During their visit to Italy, the couple proved to be much in love since Paul could not stop giving kisses in public to his wife, surprising their travelling companions. On their way back to Saint Petersburg, Maria went to Württemberg to visit her parents. At the end of 1782, the couple returned to Russia and devoted their attention to Pavlovsk Palace, where Maria gave birth to Alexandra Pavlovna, the first of six daughters she would bear during the next twelve years. To celebrate Alexandra's birth, Catherine II gave them the Palace of Gatchina, which would occupy their attention until they were called to the throne. She let the parents raise their daughters and younger sons. From then on the Russian Imperial house would be a large family.

=== Last years ===
During the long years of Catherine's reign, Maria and Paul were forced to live in isolation in Gatchina with a tight income. Unlike the Romanovs, Maria was frugal, a rare virtue in a princess of that time only developed because of her large family that for a long time was only a minor royal branch. She continued to beautify Pavlovsk, dedicated herself to charitable work among its inhabitants, planned theatrical events for her husband, who delighted in that amusement, and participated in musical evenings for family and friends in which she adeptly played the harpsichord. She was devoted to expanding her modest literary salon, which was frequented by poet Vasily Zhukovsky, fabulist Ivan Krylov, and historian Nikolai Karamzin. Maria prided herself in being more clever than her mother-in-law and never lost the opportunity of contrasting her impeccable virtue with the failings of the reigning Empress. She was equally watchful to attack Catherine's favourites, Grigori Alexandrovich Potemkin and Alexander Dmitriev-Mamonov.

Maria Feodorovna kept voluminous diaries that recorded her life in detail, but her son Nicholas I burned all these volumes after her death according to her last wishes. Even most of the letters she wrote have not survived since she usually requested that they be burnt. The relationship between Paul and Catherine Nelidova, one of Maria's ladies-in-waiting, was the cause of the first crack in their marriage during those years. The intense liaison was particularly painful for Maria, as the other woman had been her friend. Although Paul said that his relations with Nelidova were only platonic, Maria's own relationship with Nelidova became very bitter for several years. However, she eventually joined forces with her former friend in an attempt to moderate her husband's increasingly neurotic temperament.

== Empress of Russia ==
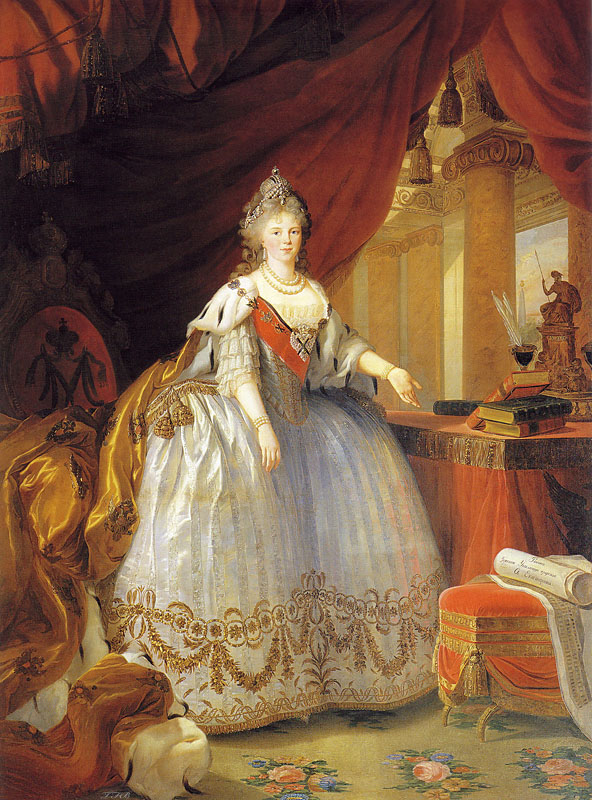
Tsarina Maria Feodorovna during her husband's reign, c. 1798

After twenty years in the shadows, the death of Catherine II in 1796 allowed Maria Feodorovna to have a prominent role as Empress consort. During Catherine's lifetime, Maria had no chance of interfering in affairs of state, as Paul himself was excluded, but after her husband's accession to the throne, she took to politics, at first timidly, but increasingly resolutely afterwards. Her influence over her husband was very great, and in general beneficial. Even so, it is possible that she abused it in order to help her friends or hurt her enemies. Although the imperial couple wasn't as close as they once had been, there remained a good deal of respect, dependence and warmth between them. Their relationship suffered further in the last years of Paul's life. After Maria gave birth to her tenth and last child in 1798, Paul became infatuated with 19-year-old Anna Lopukhina and lied to his wife that the relationship was of a paternal nature. Paul was Emperor for four years, four months, and six days. He was murdered on 11 March 1801.

On the night of her husband's assassination, Maria Feodorovna thought to imitate the example of her mother-in-law and tried to seize power to become empress regnant on the grounds that she had been crowned with Paul. It took her son Alexander several days to persuade her to relinquish her reckless claim, for which she had no party to support her. For some time afterward, whenever her son came to visit, the Dowager Empress would place a casket between them containing the bloodstained nightshirt that his father was wearing on the day of the murder as a silent reproach. The strained relationship between mother and son improved though and thanks to the new Tsar, 42-years-old Maria Feodorovna kept the highest female position at court and often took the emperor's arm in public ceremonies, while Empress Elizabeth had to walk behind. This custom of precedence and superiority of the Dowager Empress over the reigning monarch's wife was introduced by Maria and was unique to the Russian court, though it caused resentment with her eldest daughter-in-law. Perpetuating the tradition of Catherine II, she attended parades in military uniform, the cordon of an order across her breast.

=== Charity institutions ===
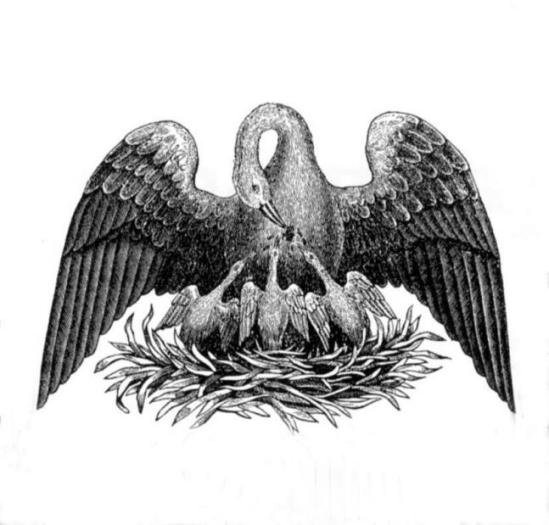
Her office's emblem: A bird mother feeding her hungry children.

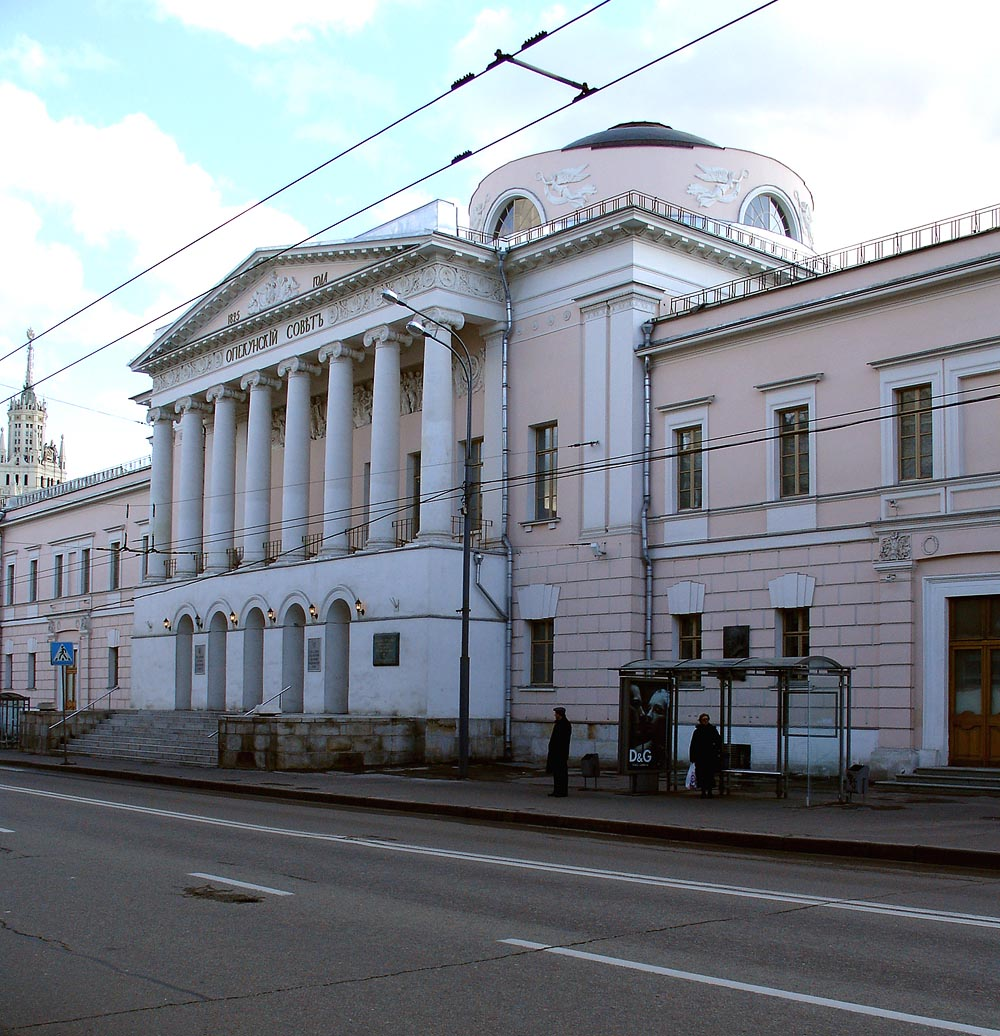
The building of the board of trustees was erected shortly before Maria's death. In the 1820s, the Board controlled Moscow's largest bank.

In May 1797, Tsar Paul asked Maria Feodorovna to oversee the national charities. She encouraged a thorough inspection of prospective foster parents and limited admissions "from the street", measures which decreased the inflow of new orphans and considerably reduced mortality. By 1826, the mortality rate was reduced to 15% per annum, a figure outrageous by modern standards but a great improvement on the 18th century.

Even after her husband's death, Maria Feodorovna continued to manage all the empire's charitable establishments and control the bank for loans. By 1828, their total assets exceeded 359 million roubles, the largest capital assets in all of Moscow. After the end of the Napoleonic wars, the Board of Trustees capitalized on the recent disaster by building cheap rental housing on its properties. As a result of this policy, the new facilities housed up to 8,000 residents of all ranks in the 1820s. These institutions existed until the Russian Revolution of 1917.

Maria Feodorovna realized the need to downsize the institution, separating children from older tenants and improving the educational program for the former. She transferred the younger inhabitants to new, independent orphanages. The Moscow Crafts College, the largest spin-off, was established as an orphanage for teenagers in 1830 and continues today as the Bauman Moscow State Technical University. In the orphanage, there were high-level educational programs along the lines of the "Latin classes for boys and the "midwife classes for girls". After meeting a deaf boy, Maria established the first Russian school for the deaf in 1807 and supported the career of the blind musician Charlotta Seuerling, whose mother she saved from ruin. Shortly before Empress Maria's death, the Orphanage took the ablest children from the streets and prepared them for professional careers. Among the teachers were Sergey Solovyov, Alexander Vostokov, Vasily Klyuchevsky, Nicholas Benois, and Vasily Vereshchagin.

=== Building projects ===
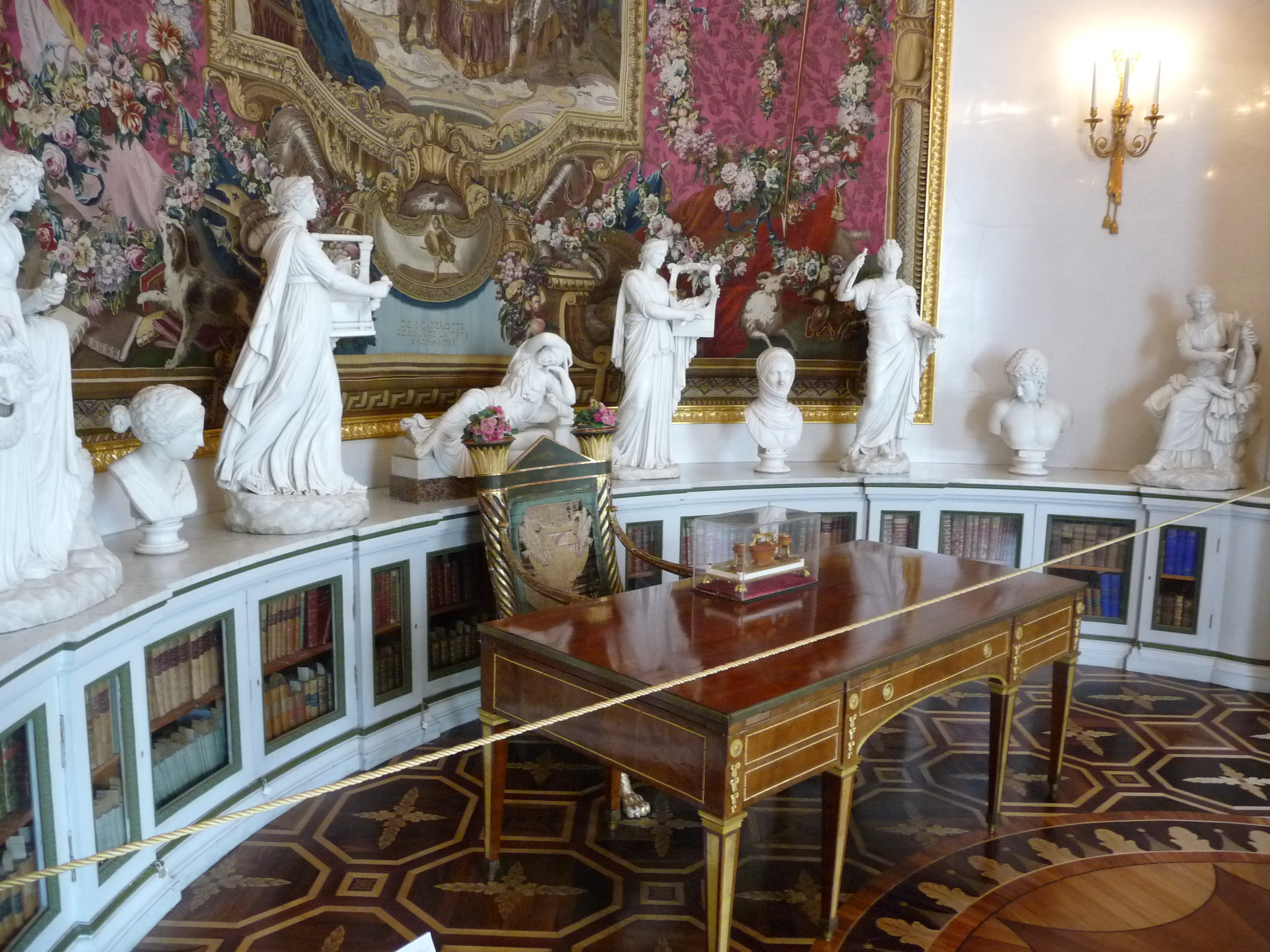
Pavlovsk Palace: The cabinet of Maria Feodorovna.

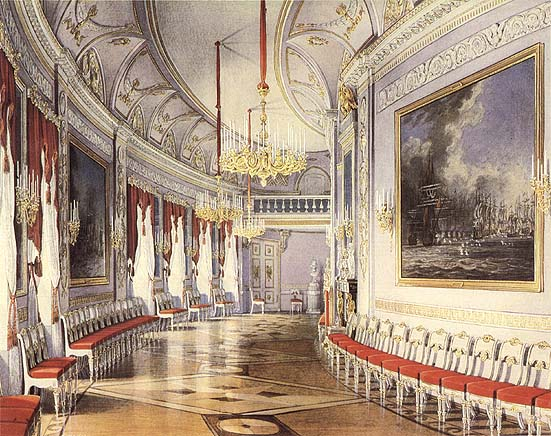
Gatchina Palace: The Chesma Gallery in the Neoclassical style of the 1790s. Eduard Hau, 1877.

Maria Feodorovna had exceptional taste. She was skilled at architecture, watercolor; engraving; designing objects of ivory and amber; and horticulture. The palaces of Pavlovsk, Gatchina, Tsarskoye Selo, the Winter Palace in Saint Petersburg, and the Hermitage were remodelled and furnished under her personal guidance. Her efforts would produce some of the most beautiful estates in all of Russia.

Maria Fedorovna and Paul began remodelling Pavlovsk. She insisted in having several rustic structures which recalled the palace where she grew up at Étupes, 40 miles from Basel. During their travels in 1781, the couple sent back and forth drawings, plans and notes on the smallest details. She brought Italian architect Carlo Rossi to redesign the library to contain more than twenty thousand books. After Paul's death in 1801, Gatchina Palace came into the ownership of the new Dowager Empress, who used her experience from her travels around Europe to redo the interiors in the Neoclassical style and make alterations to adapt it "in case of winter stay" in 1809.

=== Foreign relationships ===
Maria Feodorovna enjoyed a considerable income which made possible for her to live in grand style. Her elegant receptions, where she appeared sumptuously dressed and was surrounded by chamberlains, were in sharp contrast with the simple court life of Alexander I, whose retiring ways and the withdrawn personality of his wife were no match for the Dowager Empress' old splendor in the style of the time of Catherine the Great. Her exalted position made her palace at Pavlovsk a mandatory place to visit for the great personages of Saint Petersburg. She used her position to help as much as possible her numerous poor relations, some of whom were invited to Russia. Examples include her brother, Prince Alexander of Württemberg (1771–1833).

Maria Feodorovna transformed her court into the center of anti-Napoleon sentiment during the Napoleonic Wars and vehemently opposed any approach her son made to get to an agreement with Napoleon Bonaparte. When the French Emperor offered to marry her youngest daughter Anna Pavlovna, Maria strongly opposed the proposed marriage.

== Dowager Empress and death ==
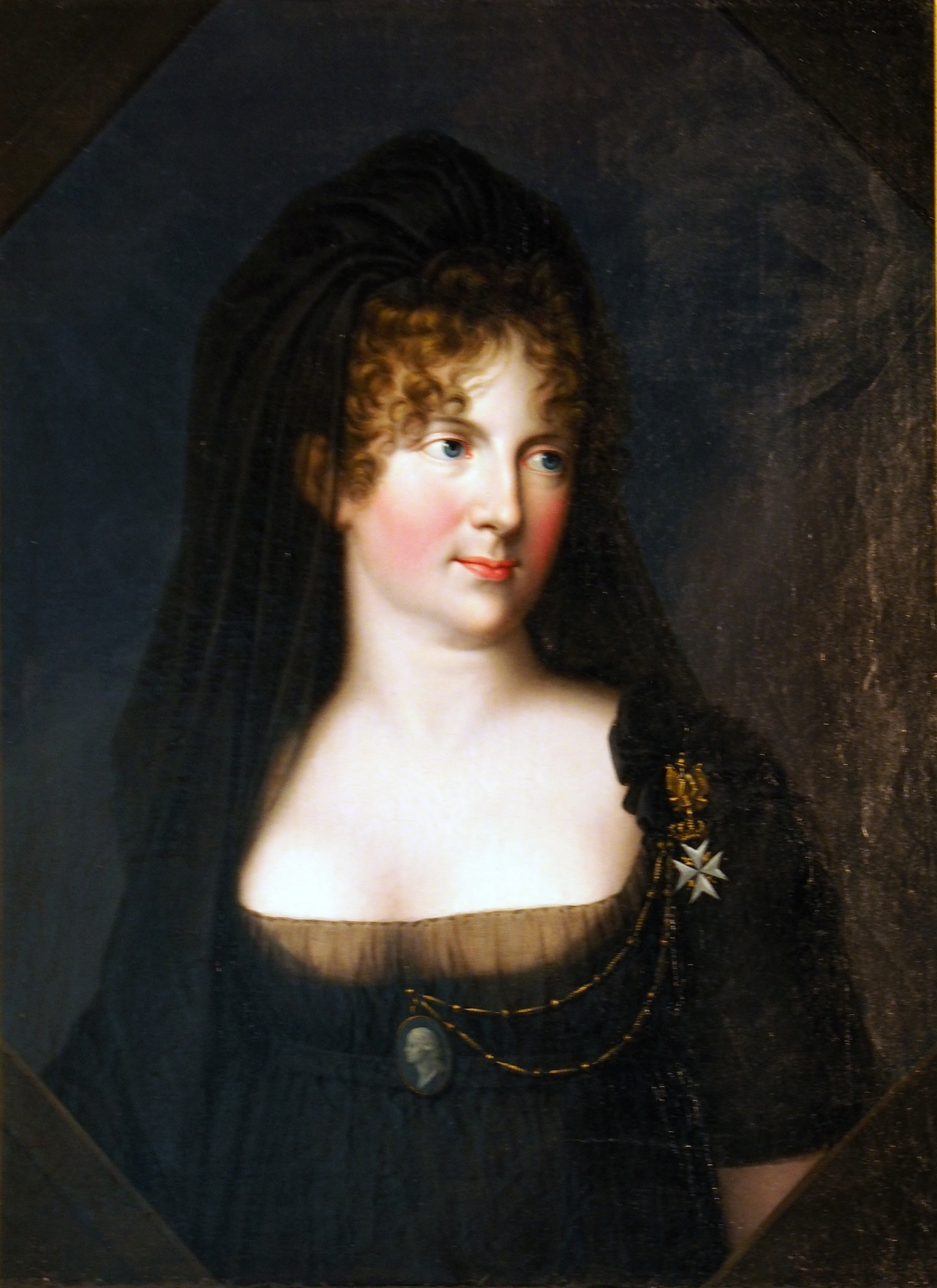
Dowager Empress Maria by Gerhard von Kügelgen, c. 1801.

Even past age 50, Maria Feodorovna retained traces of her youthful freshness. Feodorovna outlived five of her ten children, including her eldest son and his wife. She witnessed the accession of her third son, Nicholas I, to the Russian throne. After her children reached adulthood, she maintained regular correspondence with them, although most times their relationships were distant.

In 1822, Empress Maria Feodorovna moved into the renovated Yelagin Palace, but died in Winter Palace, Saint Petersburg, Russia, on 5 November 1828, at the age of 69. She outlived half of her children. Her memory was revered by her children, who named their eldest daughters in her honour except for Grand Duchess Alexandra Pavlovna. Later Russian tsarinas looked up to her and used her as a role model. Pavlovsk Palace, in which Maria lived for so long and on which she left a major imprint, was maintained for her descendants as she left it, almost as a family museum, in accordance with her instructions, first by her younger son Michael and later by the Konstantinovich branch of the family, who inherited and kept it until the Russian Revolution.

== Issue ==
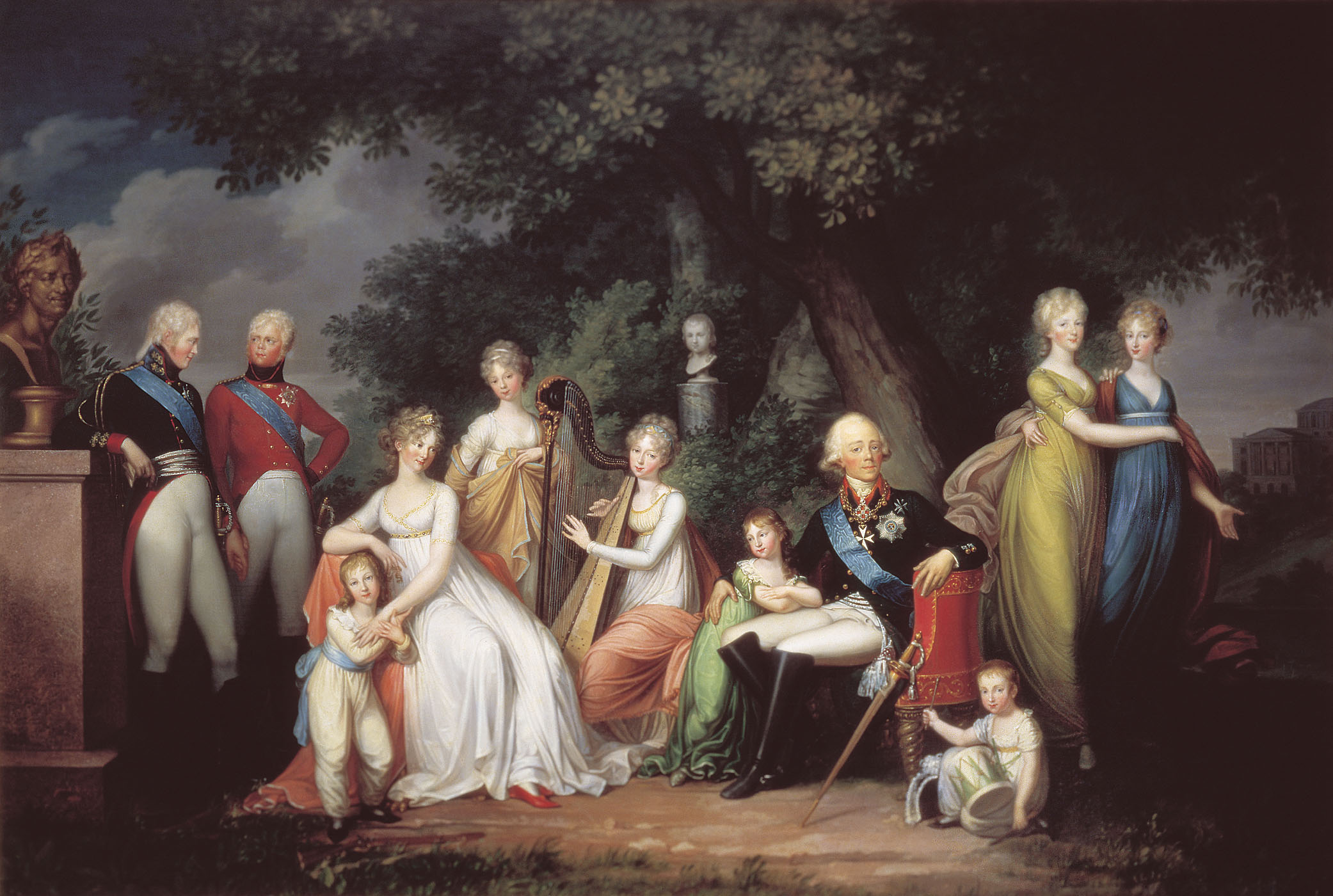
The family of Tsar Paul I and Empress Maria Feodorovna by Gerhard von Kügelgen, 1800.

Throughout her marriage with Paul I of Russia, Maria Feodorovna had ten children.

Name	Birth	Death	Notes
Alexander I, Emperor of Russia	12 December 1777	19 November 1825	Married Princess Luise Auguste of Baden (Elizabeth Alexeiyevna) (1779–1826) and had two daughters (both died in childhood).
Grand Duke Constantin Pavlovich of Russia	27 April 1779	15 June 1831	Married Princess Juliane of Saxe-Coburg-Saalfeld (Anna Feodorovna) (1781–1860). Married Joanna, Countess Grudsinska, Princess Lowicz (1791–1831). No issue.
Grand Duchess Alexandra Pavlovna of Russia	9 August 1783	16 March 1801	Married Archduke Joseph of Austria, Count Palatine of Hungary (1776–1847). Had one daughter (died at birth).
Grand Duchess Elena Pavlovna of Russia	13 December 1784	24 September 1803	Married Friedrich Ludwig, Hereditary Grand Duke of Mecklenburg-Schwerin (1778–1819). Had two children.
Grand Duchess Maria Pavlovna of Russia	4 February 1786	23 June 1859	Married Karl Friedrich, Grand Duke of Saxe-Weimar-Eisenach (1783–1853). Had four children.
Grand Duchess Catherine Pavlovna of Russia	21 May 1788	9 January 1819	Married Duke Georg of Oldenburg (1784–1812) and had two sons. Married King William I of Württemberg (1781–1864) and had two daughters.
Grand Duchess Olga Pavlovna of Russia	22 July 1792	26 January 1795	
Grand Duchess Anna Pavlovna of Russia	7 January 1795	1 March 1865	Married King William II of the Netherlands (1792–1849) and had five children.
Nicholas I, Emperor of Russia	25 June 1796	18 February 1855	Married Princess Charlotte of Prussia (Alexandra Feodorovna) (1798–1860) and had ten children.
Grand Duke Michael Pavlovich of Russia	8 February 1798	9 September 1849	Married Princess Charlotte of Württemberg (Elena Pavlovna) (1807–1873) and had five children.

Maria Feodorovna was a considerate, loving mother who managed to maintain genuinely close relationships with all her children despite the fact that Catherine II took over her two eldest sons in their early years. The future of her daughters and the education of her younger sons kept Maria's attention occupied during the first years of her widowhood. She had total control over the future Nicholas I and Grand Duke Michael. She was influential in the early education of her grandson, the future Alexander II. Maria tried to surpass the education which Catherine II had provided for her two eldest sons, but did not choose the best teachers for the younger ones.

== Archives ==
Maria Feodorovna's letters to her brother, Frederick I of Württemberg, are preserved in the State Archive of Stuttgart (Hauptstaatsarchiv Stuttgart) in Stuttgart, Germany, as well as her correspondence with other family members. Maria Feodorovna's correspondence with her parents, Frederick II Eugene, Duke of Württemberg, and Friederike of Brandenburg-Schwedt, written between 1776 and 1797, is also preserved in the State Archive of Stuttgart. In addition, Maria Feodorovna's letters to Friedrich Freiherrn von Maucler and his wife Luise Sophie Eleonore LeFort are also preserved in the State Archive of Stuttgart.

== See also ==
- Office of the Institutions of Empress Maria
- Mariupol

== Ancestry ==
Maria Feodorovna was descendant of King George I of Great Britain through her maternal great-grandmother Sophia Dorothea of Hanover.

Ancestors of Maria Feodorovna (Sophie Dorothea of Württemberg)

8. Frederick Charles, Duke of Württemberg-Winnental
4. Charles Alexander, Duke of Württemberg
9. Princess Eleonore Juliane of Brandenburg-Ansbach
2. Frederick II Eugene, Duke of Württemberg
10. Anselm Franz, Prince of Thurn and Taxis
5. Princess Marie Auguste of Thurn and Taxis
11. Princess Maria Ludovika of Lobkowicz
1. Sophie Dorothea of Württemberg
12. Philip William, Margrave of Brandenburg-Schwedt
6. Frederick William, Margrave of Brandenburg-Schwedt
13. Princess Johanna Charlotte of Anhalt-Dessau
3. Princess Friederike of Brandenburg-Schwedt
14. Frederick William I of Prussia
7. Princess Sophia Dorothea of Prussia
15. Princess Sophia Dorothea of Hanover

== Bibliography ==
- Lincoln, W. Bruce, The Romanovs: Autocrats of All the Russias, Anchor, ISBN 0-385-27908-6.
- Bernhard A. Macek, Haydn, Mozart und die Großfürstin: Eine Studie zur Uraufführung der "Russischen Quartette" op. 33 in den Kaiserappartements der Wiener Hofburg, Schloß Schönbrunn Kultur- und Betriebsges.m.b.H., 2012, ISBN 3-901568-72-7.
- Burch, Susan. "Transcending Revolutions: The Tsars, the Soviets and Deaf Culture." Journal of Social History 34.2 (2000): 393–401.
- Massie, Suzanne, Pavlovsk: The Life of a Russian Palace, Hodder & Stoughton,1990, ISBN 0-340-48790-9.
- Ragsdale, Hugh, Tsar Paul and the Question of Madness: An Essay in History and Psychology, Greenwood Press, ISBN 0-313-26608-5.
- Troyat, Henri, Alexander of Russia, Dutton, ISBN 0-525-24144-2
- Troyat, Henri, Catherine the Great, Plume, ISBN 0-452-01120-5
- Madame Vigée Lebrun, Memoirs, Doubleday, Page & Company, ISBN 0-8076-1221-9
- Waliszewski, Kazimierz, Paul the First of Russia, the son of Catherine the Great, Archon, ISBN 0-208-00743-1

Maria Feodorovna (Sophie Dorothea of Württemberg) House of Württemberg Born: 25 October 1759 Died: 5 November 1828
Russian royalty
Vacant Title last held by Yekaterina Alexeievna (Sophie of Anhalt-Zerbst)	Empress consort of Russia; 1796–1801	Succeeded by Elizabeth Alexeievna (Louise of Baden)
