= List of palaces in Germany =

German has contrasting words for what may be considered a palace: Burg which connotes a seat that is enclosed by walls, a fastness or keep, and Schloss, a more conscious borrowing, with the usual connotations of splendour. In practice, the Schloss is more likely to be a royal or ducal palace. Besides, the term Palais is mostly used for noble manor houses or palatial residences.

== Baden-Württemberg ==
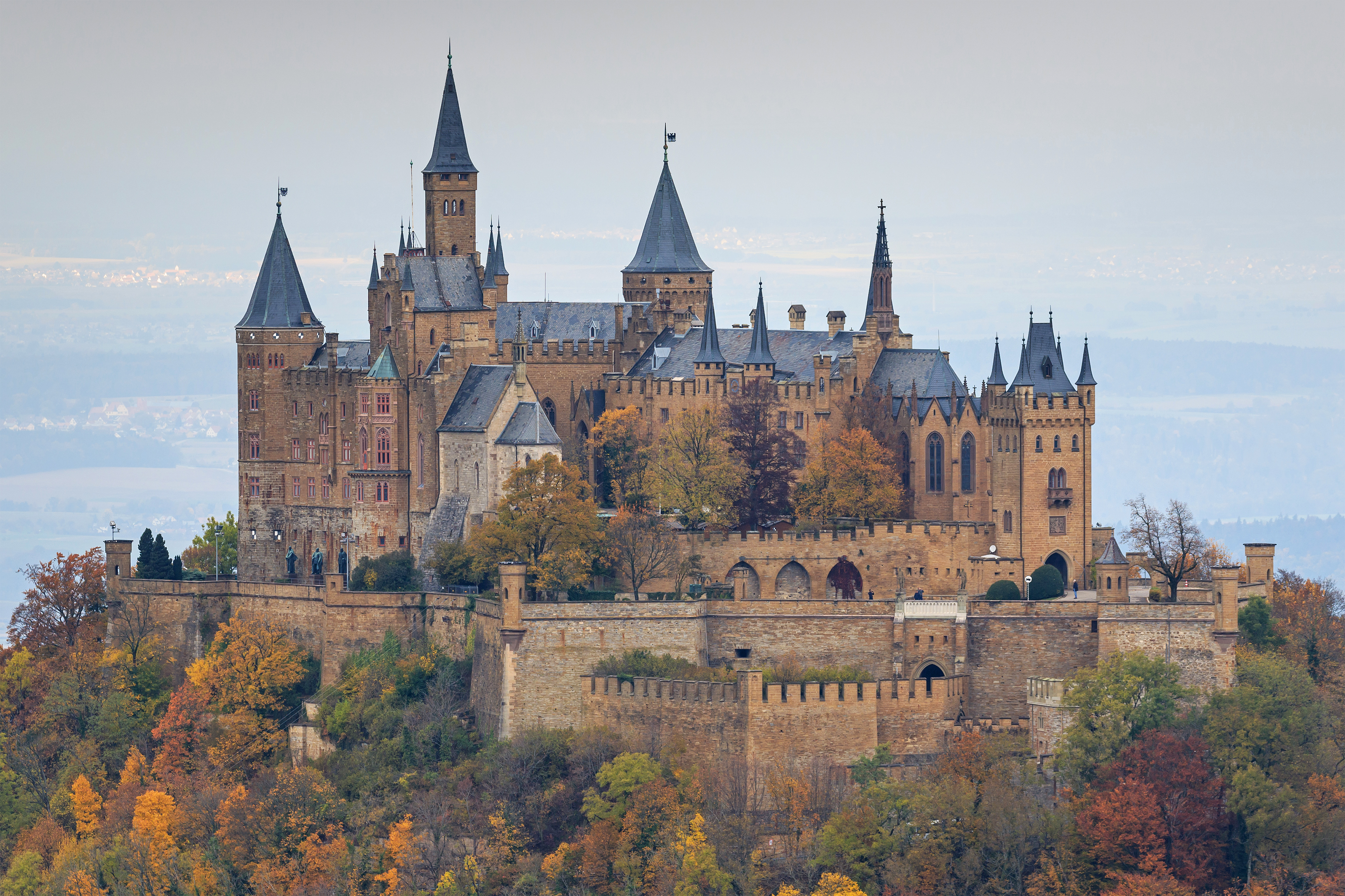
Hohenzollern Castle

- Bruchsal Palace, Bruchsal, residence of the Prince-Bishops of Speyer
- Heidelberg Castle, Heidelberg, residence of the Electors Palatine
- Hohenzollern Castle, show castle of the kings of Prussia
- Karlsruhe Palace, Karlsruhe, residence of the Grand Dukes of Baden
- Ludwigsburg Palace, Ludwigsburg, residence of the Kings of Württemberg
- Mannheim Palace, Mannheim, residence of the Electors Palatine
- Burg Meersburg, Meersburg, residence of the Prince-Bishops of Constance
- Neues Schloss, Meersburg, residence of the Prince-Bishops of Constance
- Schwetzingen Castle, Schwetzingen, residence of the Electors Palatine
- Sigmaringen Castle, residence of the princes of Hohenzollern-Sigmaringen
- Old Castle, Stuttgart, residence of the Kings of Württemberg
- New Castle, Stuttgart, residence of the Kings of Württemberg
- Castle Solitude, Stuttgart, residence of the Kings of Württemberg

== Bavaria ==
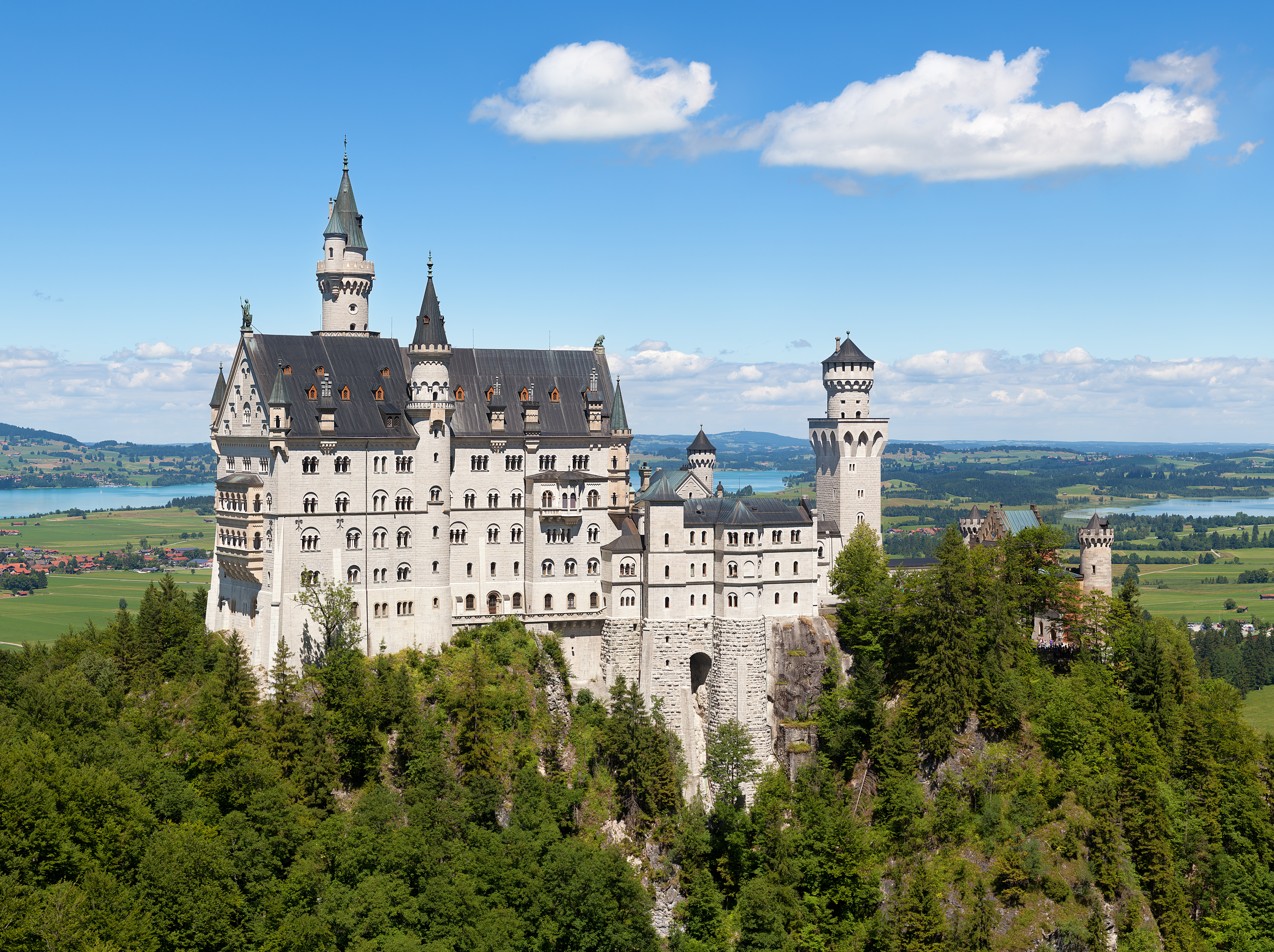
Famous Neuschwanstein Castle in the Bavarian Alps

- Herrenchiemsee, palace built by Ludwig II of Bavaria
- Linderhof Palace, palace built by Ludwig II of Bavaria
- Neuschwanstein, palace built by Ludwig II of Bavaria
- Ansbach Residence, Ansbach, residence of the margraves of Ansbach
- Seehof Palace, Memmelsdorf
- Alte Hofhaltung and Neue Residenz, Bamberg, residence of the prince-bishops of Bamberg
- New Castle, Bayreuth, residence of the margraves of Bayreuth
- Ehrenburg Palace, Coburg
- Ducal Palace, Coburg, residence of the dukes of Saxe-Coburg
- Nymphenburg Palace, Munich, chief summer residence of the kings of Bavaria
- Weißenstein Palace, Pommersfelden
- Munich Residenz, Munich, chief residence of the kings of Bavaria
- Veste Oberhaus, Passau – residence of the prince-bishops of Passau
- Ellingen Residence, Ellingen
- St. Emmeram's Abbey – seat of the princes of Thurn und Taxis, Regensburg
- Callenberg Castle, Coburg
- Würzburg Residence – seat of the prince-bishops of Würzburg
- Rosenau Palace, Coburg
- Palais Leuchtenberg – palace for the first Duke of Leuchtenberg
- Fantaisie Palace, Bayreuth
- Fortress Marienberg – seat of the prince-bishops of Würzburg
- Dachau Palace
- Haimhausen Palace
- Fürstenried Palace
- Johannisburg Palace
- Ketschendorf Palace
- King's House on Schachen
- Schloss Elmau

== Berlin ==
Schloss Charlottenburg, Berlin

- Bellevue Palace – seat of Federal President, Berlin
- Berlin Palace – former residence of the Hohenzollern rulers
- Biesdorf Palace
- Borsig Palace
- Britz Palace
- Charlottenburg Palace – former summer palace of the Hohenzollern, Berlin
- Ephraim Palace
- Friedrichsfelde Palace – former palace of Prussian Kings and nobles
- Glienicke Palace
- Jewel Palace
- Kommandantenhaus – firstly private palace, later seat of the garrison of Berlin
- Köpenick Palace
- Crown Prince's Palace
- Mendelssohn Palace
- Monbijou Palace, Berlin (demolished)
- Old Palace, Berlin – former residence of German Emperor William I
- Ordenspalais – palace of several Prussian Kings and nobles (demolished)
- Pannwitz Palace - completed 1914, now serving as a noble hotel
- Podewils Palace - unique Baroque palace in central Berlin
- Palace of Prince Albrecht – former residence of Prince Albert of Prussia (demolished)
- Palace of Prince Henry – former residence of Prince Henry of Prussia
- Palais am Festungsgraben
- Palais Strousberg (demolished)
- Pfaueninsel Palace – former palace of Frederick William II of Prussia
- Prinzessinnenpalais – built for the princesses of the House of Hohenzollern
- Reich Chancellery – former seat of the chancellor of Germany (building demolished)
- Reichspräsidentenpalais - seat of the president of Germany during the Weimar Republic (building demolished)
- Reichstagspräsidentenpalais - former seat of the president of the Reichstag (1919-1933)
- Tegel Palace
- Schönhausen Palace
- Spandau Citadel

== Brandenburg ==
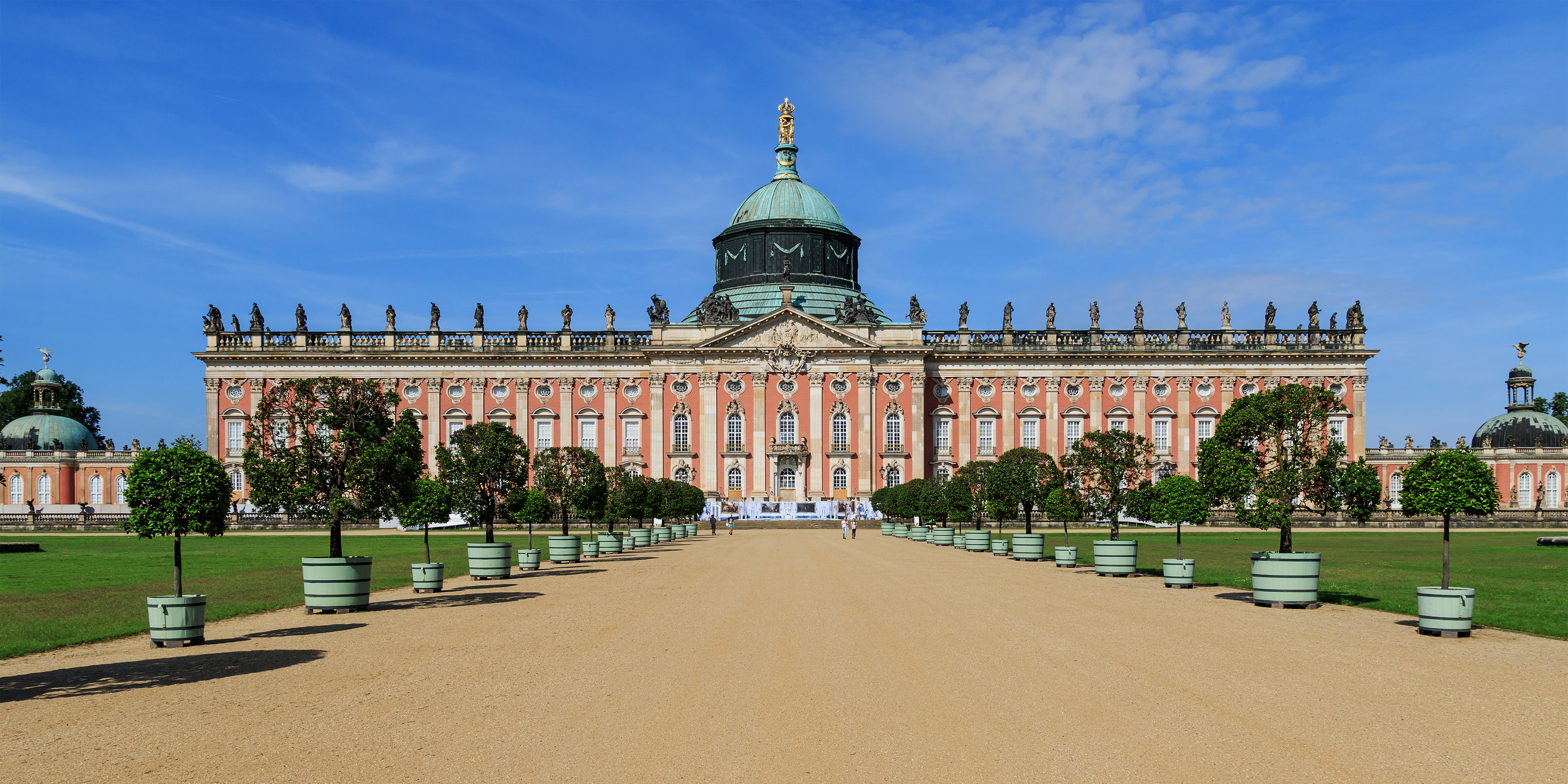
New Palace (Potsdam)

- Belvedere on the Klausberg, Potsdam
- Belvedere on the Pfingstberg, Potsdam
- City Palace – winter residence of the kings of Prussia and the German emperors
- Marmorpalais, Potsdam
- Meseberg Palace, Meseberg
- Barberini Palace, Potsdam
- New Palace – former residence of the Hohenzollern rulers, Potsdam (located in the Sanssouci Park)
- Orangery Palace, Potsdam
- Babelsberg Palace, Babelsberg quarter of Potsdam
- Rheinsberg Palace
- Cecilienhof Palace, Potsdam
- Charlottenhof Palace, Potsdam
- Sanssouci Palace – former residence of King Frederick II of Prussia of Prussia, Potsdam

== Hesse ==
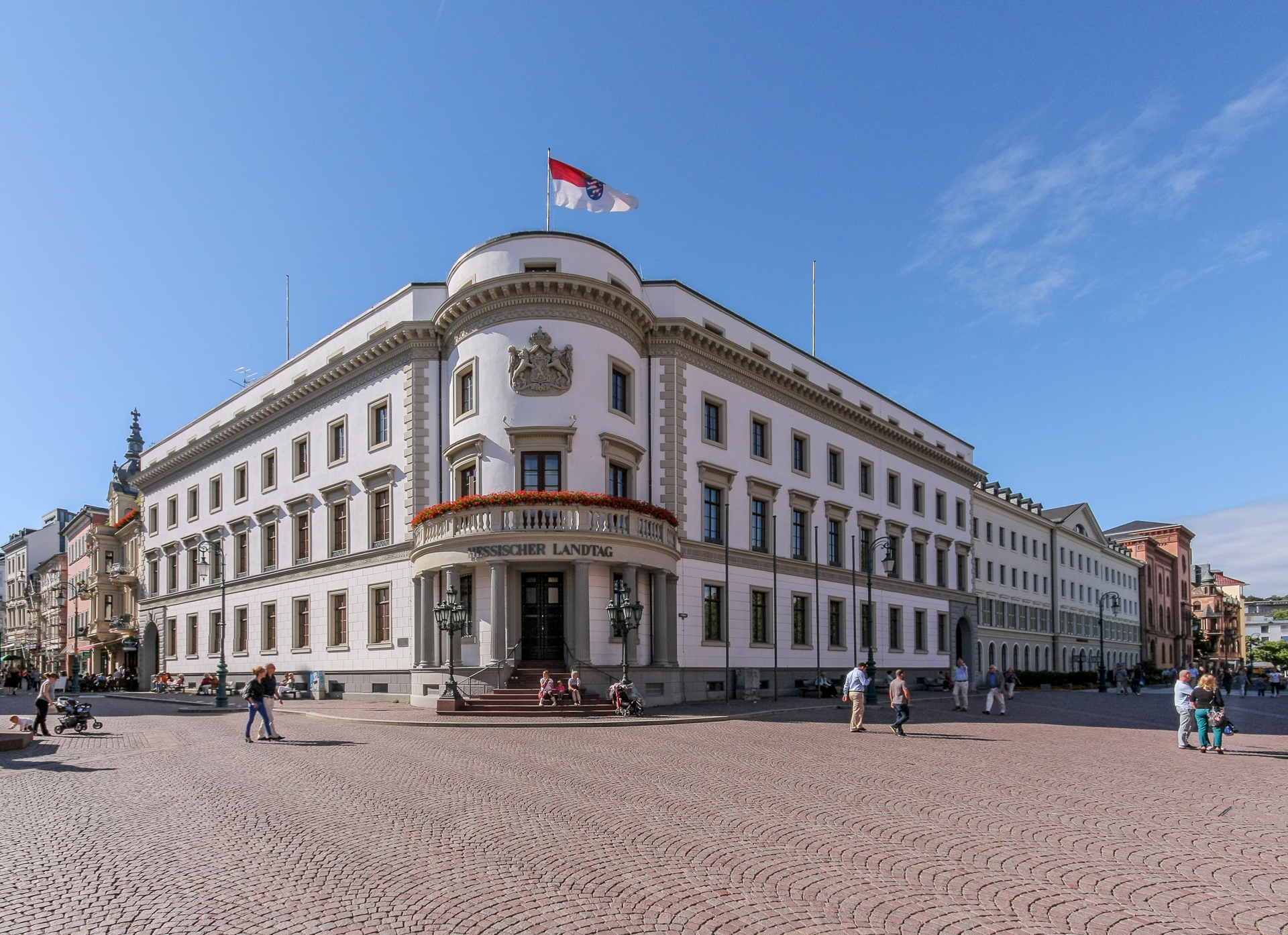
Wiesbaden City Palace

- Ducal Palace, Darmstadt, residence of the grand dukes of Hesse
- Orangery, Fulda
- Orangery, Kassel, residence of the electors of Hesse
- Philippsthal Orangery, Philippsthal
- Ducal Palace, Wiesbaden, residence of the dukes of Nassau
- Biebrich Palace, Wiesbaden
- Marburger Schloss
- Palais Thurn und Taxis, Frankfurt
- Schloss Weilburg
- Wilhelmshöhe Palace, Kassel, residence of the electors of Hesse

== Lower Saxony ==
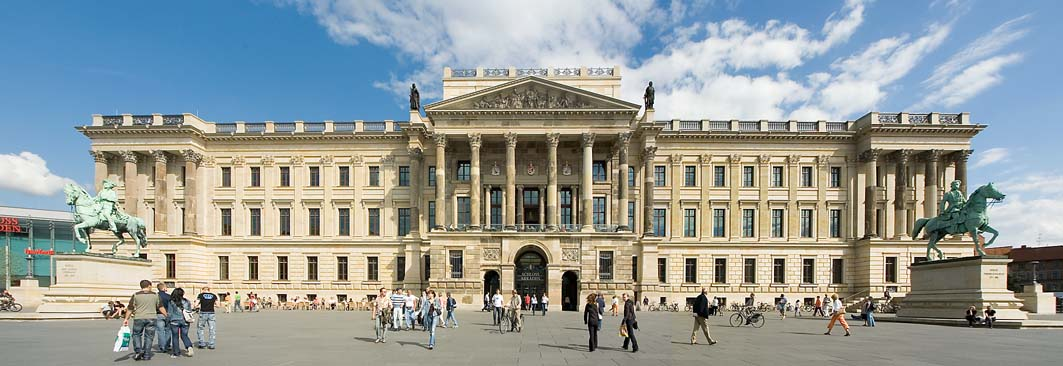
Brunswick Palace, Brunswick

== Mecklenburg-Vorpommern ==
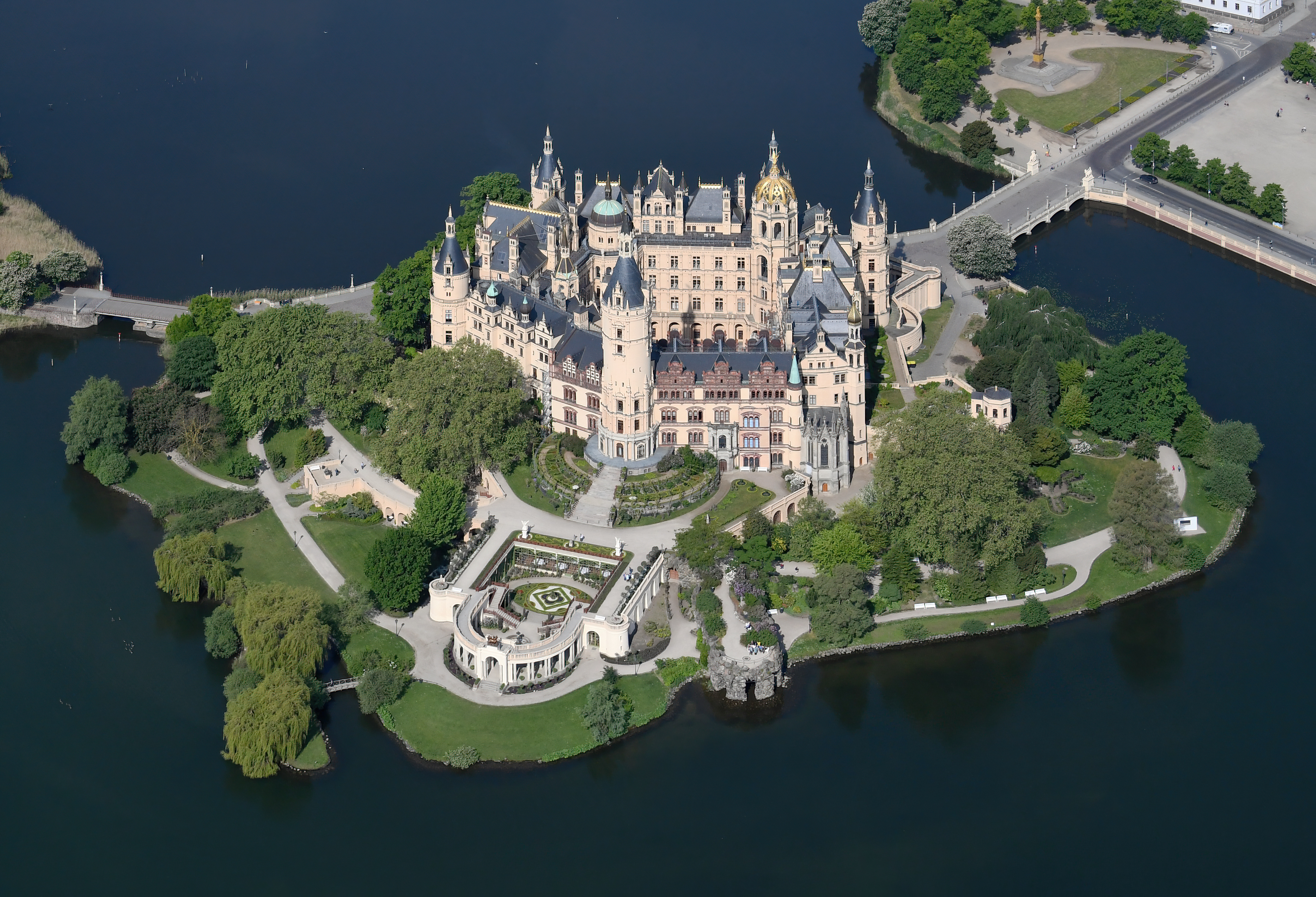
Schwerin Castle, Schwerin

- Güstrow Castle, a masterpiece of Renaissance architecture
- Schloss Bothmer, near Klütz
- Schloss Kartlow
- Schloss Ludwigslust, former duke residence in Ludwigslust
- Schloss Neustrelitz, destroyed dukes palace of Neustrelitz
- Schloss Schwerin – seat of Mecklenburg-Vorpommern state parliament in its capital city, Schwerin

== North Rhine-Westphalia ==
- Augustusburg Palace
- Electoral Palace, Bonn, residence of the archbishop-electors of Cologne
- Drachenburg Palace
- Falkenlust Palace
- Schloss Münster
- Schloss Nordkirchen
- Palais Schaumburg, Bonn
- Schloss Benrath, Düsseldorf, residence of the electors Palatine

== Rhineland-Palatinate ==
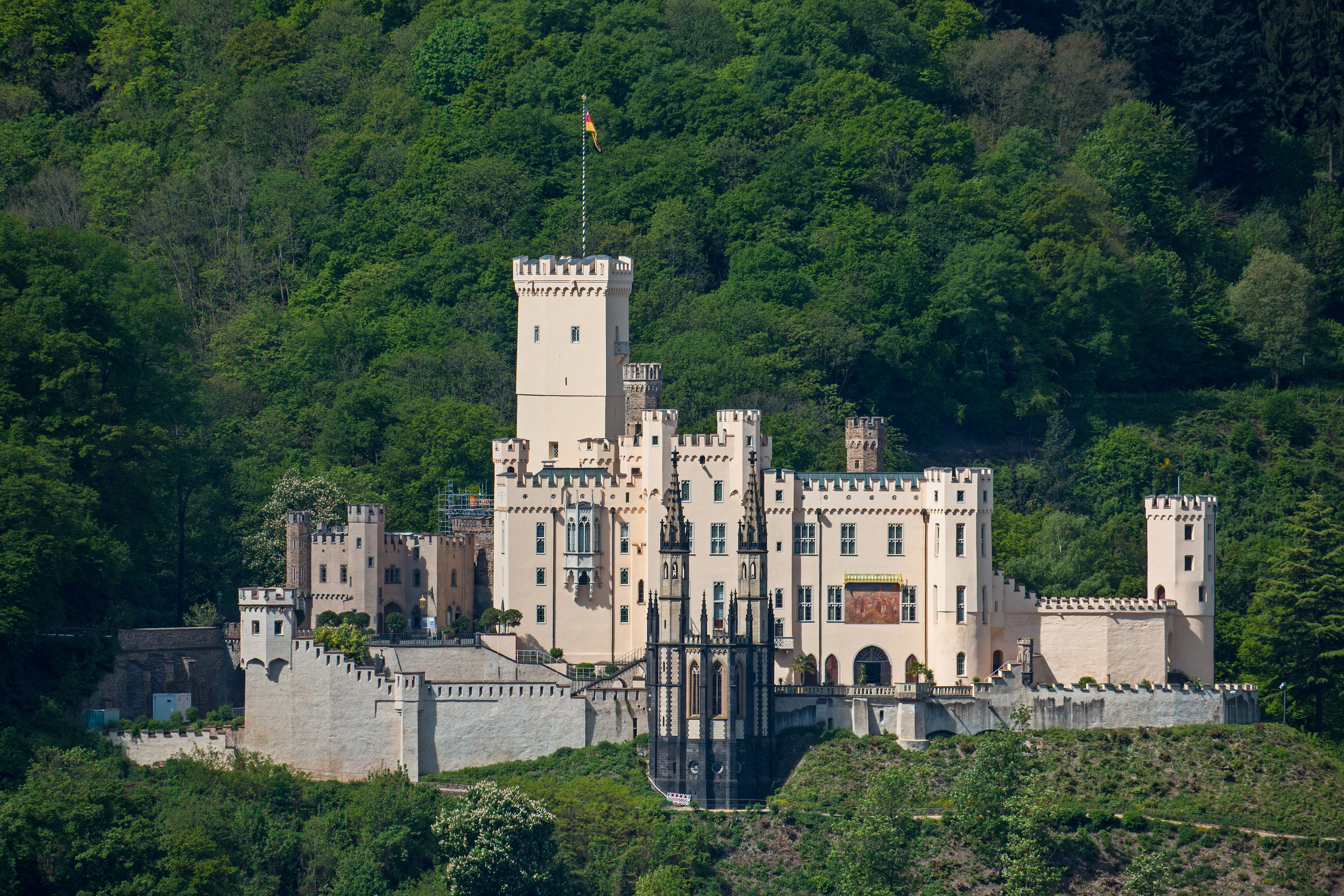
Stolzenfels Castle, Koblenz

- Electoral Palace, Koblenz
- Electoral Palace, Mainz
- Kurfürstliches Palais, Trier
- Stolzenfels Castle, Koblenz

== Saxony ==
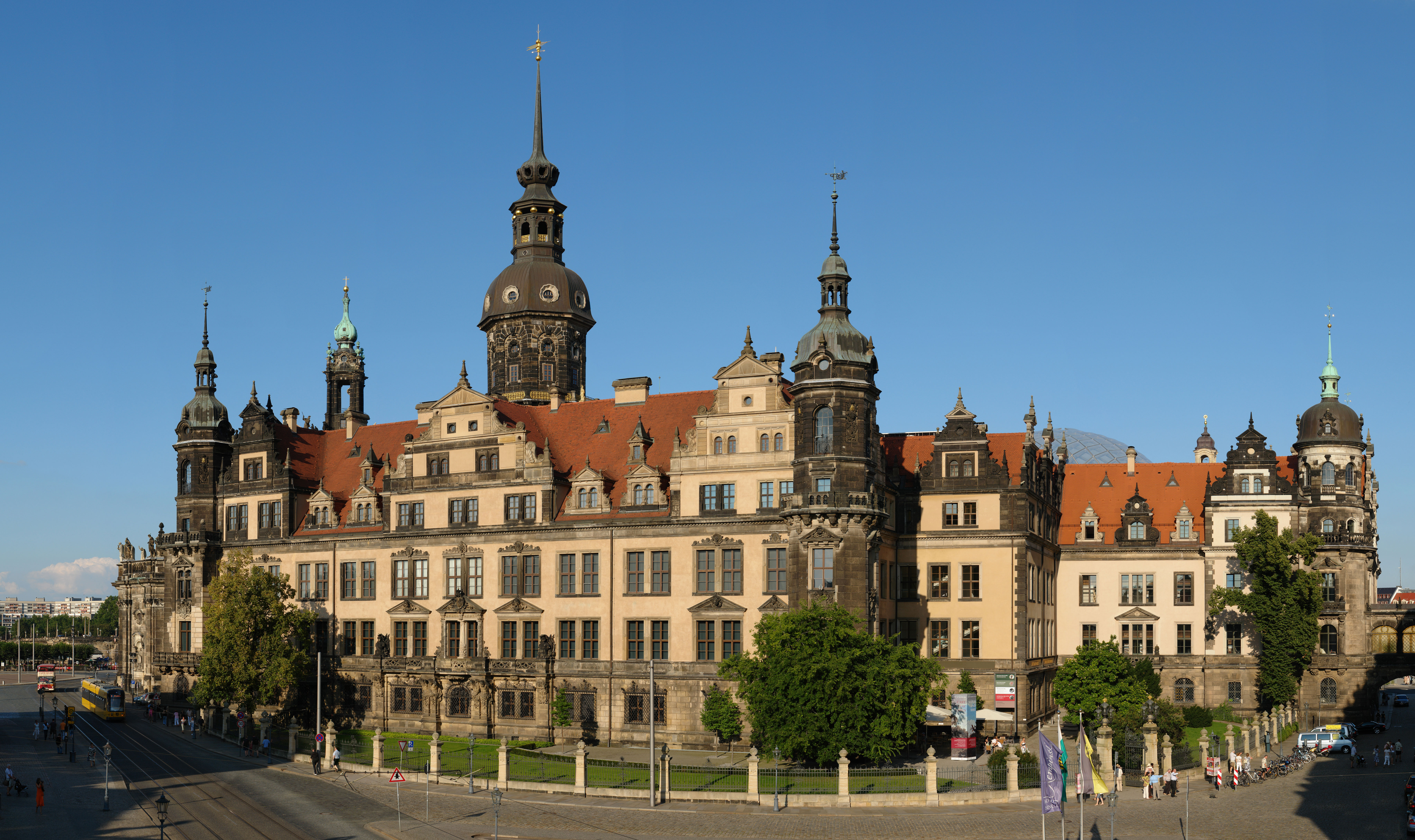
Dresden Castle, Dresden

== Thuringia ==
- Altenburg Castle, Altenburg, residence of the dukes of Saxe-Altenburg
- Schloss Friedenstein, Gotha, residence of the dukes of Saxe-Gotha
- Schloss Elisabethenburg, Meiningen, residence of the dukes of Saxe-Meiningen
- Heidecksburg, Rudolstadt, residence of the princes of Schwarzburg-Rudolstadt
- Sondershausen Palace, Sondershausen, residence of the princes of Schwarzburg-Sondershausen
- Grand Ducal Palace, Weimar, residence of the grand dukes of Saxe-Weimar

== Schleswig-Holstein ==
- Plön Castle
