= Leipziger Platz 12 =

Leipziger Platz 12 was the address of a former mansion designed by Friedrich Hitzig in Berlin, Germany. Located on the fashionable Leipziger Platz, the building was the location of the British legation from 1859 to 1878, and the Turkish embassy from 1878 to 1896. The building was then demolished.

This was the only diplomatic building ever located in the square until the completion of the new Canadian embassy there in 2005.
