= Friedrich Hitzig =

German architect

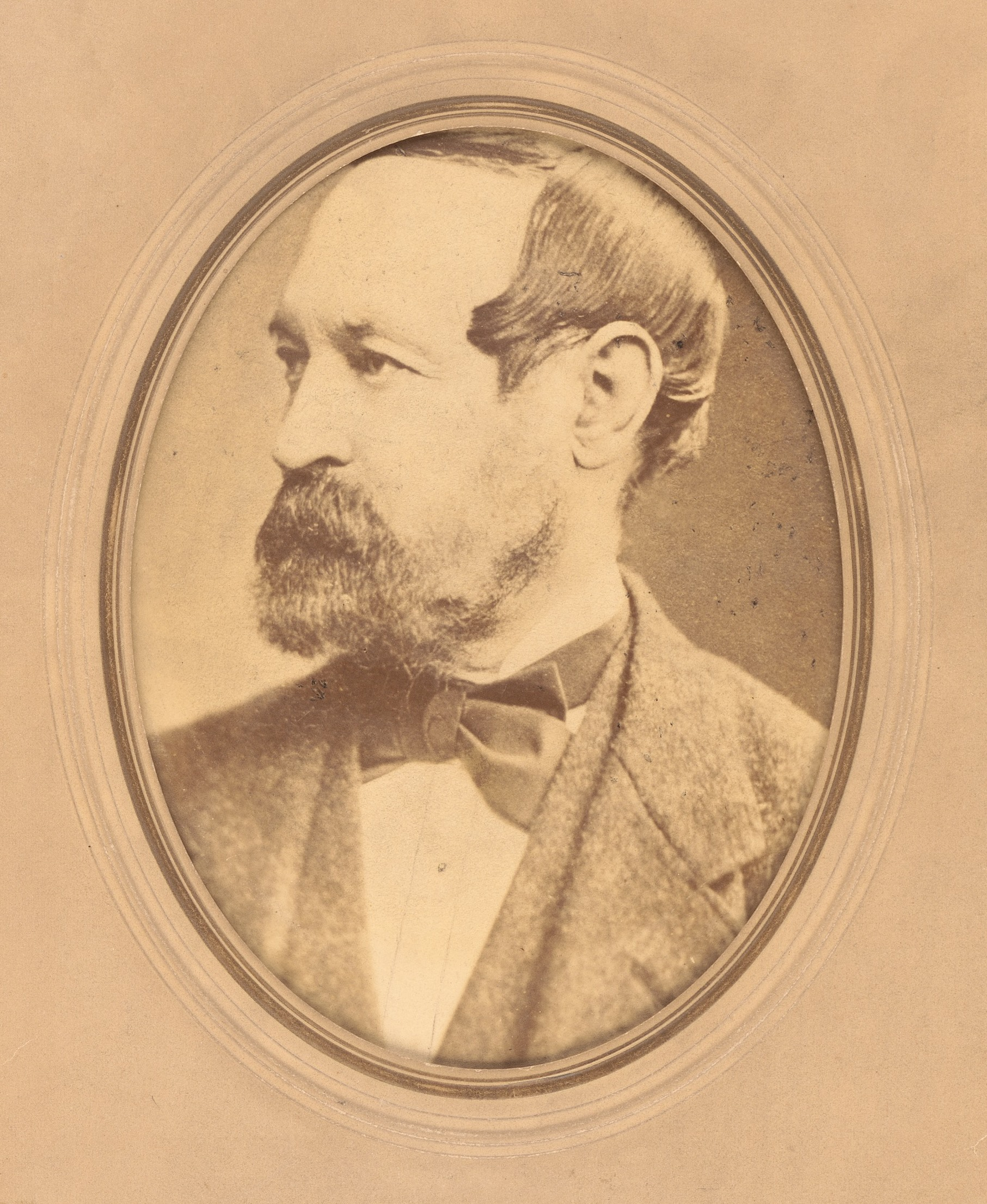
Friedrich Hitzig

Georg Friedrich Heinrich Hitzig (8 November 1811, in Berlin – 11 October 1881, in Berlin) was a German architect, born into the Jewish Itzig family, and who later converted to Lutheranism. He was a student of Karl Friedrich Schinkel.

After getting his diploma in 1835 he founded an architectural practice in Berlin. In 1855 Hitzig became a member of the Prussian Academy of Arts. In 1868 he became senator and in 1875 president of the academy. In 1880 he was elected department head for building construction of the Academy of Civil Engineering. He was also awarded with the Pour le Mérite in the peace class in 1881 for his works.

For his work he made several educational journeys to Italy, Egypt and Greece (1845/57/64).

== Notable buildings ==
- 1848–1891 Neetzow Castle
- 1853–1858 Kartlow Castle
- 1852 - ? Palazzo Revoltella, Trieste
- 1854–1855 Bredenfelde Castle
- 1859? mansion Leipziger Platz 12, Berlin (1859–1878 British Embassy, later Ottoman Embassy)
- 1859–1864 Berliner Börse (Berlin Stock Exchange), Burgstraße (destroyed in 1945)
- 1865-1867 markethall (later Circus Renz, Circus Schumann, Großes Schauspielhaus, Friedrichsstadtpalast), Am Zirkus 1, Berlin

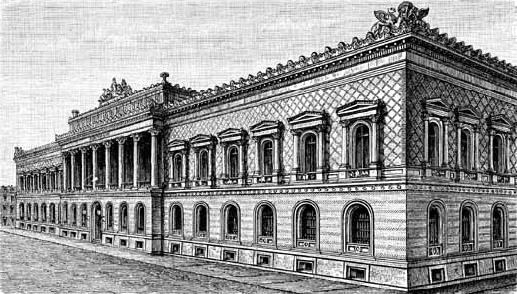
building of the Reichsbank in Berlin

- 1865-? Renovation of Remplin Palace
- 1868: Disconto-Gesellschaft head office, Berlin
- 1868–1871 Kronenberg Palace (Pałac Kronenberga w Warszawie), Warsaw (Poland)
- 1869–1878 Reichsbank (German central bank), Jägerstraße, Berlin (destroyed in 1945)
- 1870–1871 Palais Frerich, Berlin-Tiergarten (later part of the Embassy of Switzerland)
- 1877–1881 Refurbishing of the Zeughaus in Berlin
- 1878–1884 building of the Technische Hochschule in Berlin (now Technische Universität Berlin), (Berlin-) Charlottenburg
- Numerous villas and houses in the Berlin districts of Friedrichstadt and Tiergarten

== See also ==
- Itzig family
