= Börse Berlin =

Stock exchange located in Berlin, Germany

- Type: Stock exchange
- Location: Berlin, Germany
- Coordinates: 52°29′48″N 13°17′24″E
- Founded: 1685; 341 years ago
- Owner: Tradegate Exchange GmbH
- Currency: Euro
- Website: boerse-berlin.com

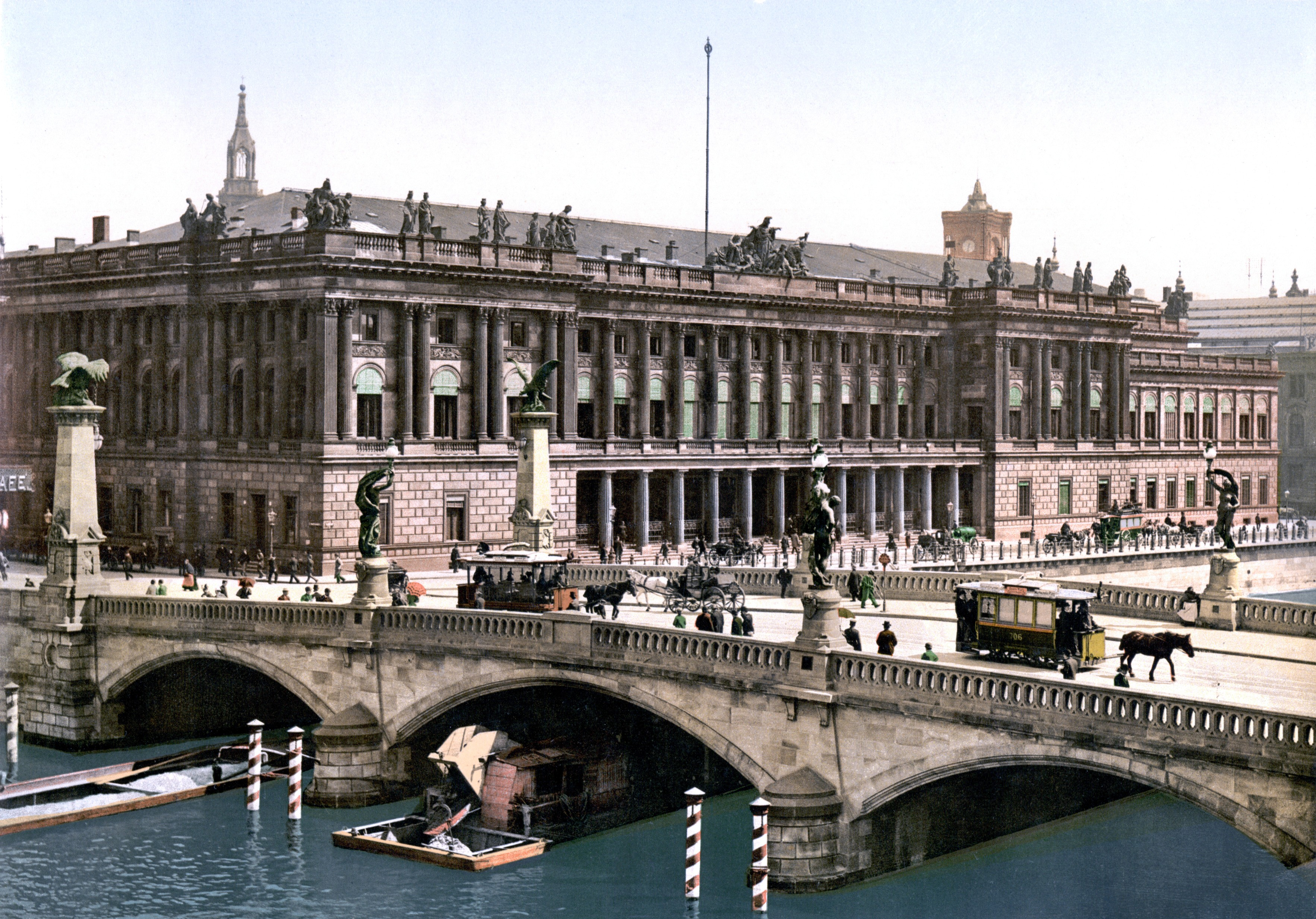
The former building of the Berlin Stock Exchange, designed by Friedrich Hitzig, as it appeared in 1900

Börse Berlin AG, also known as the Berlin Stock Exchange, is a stock exchange based in Berlin, Germany, in the Charlottenburg-Wilmersdorf borough. Founded in 1685 by an edict of Elector Friedrich Wilhelm, it is one of the oldest stock exchanges in Germany.

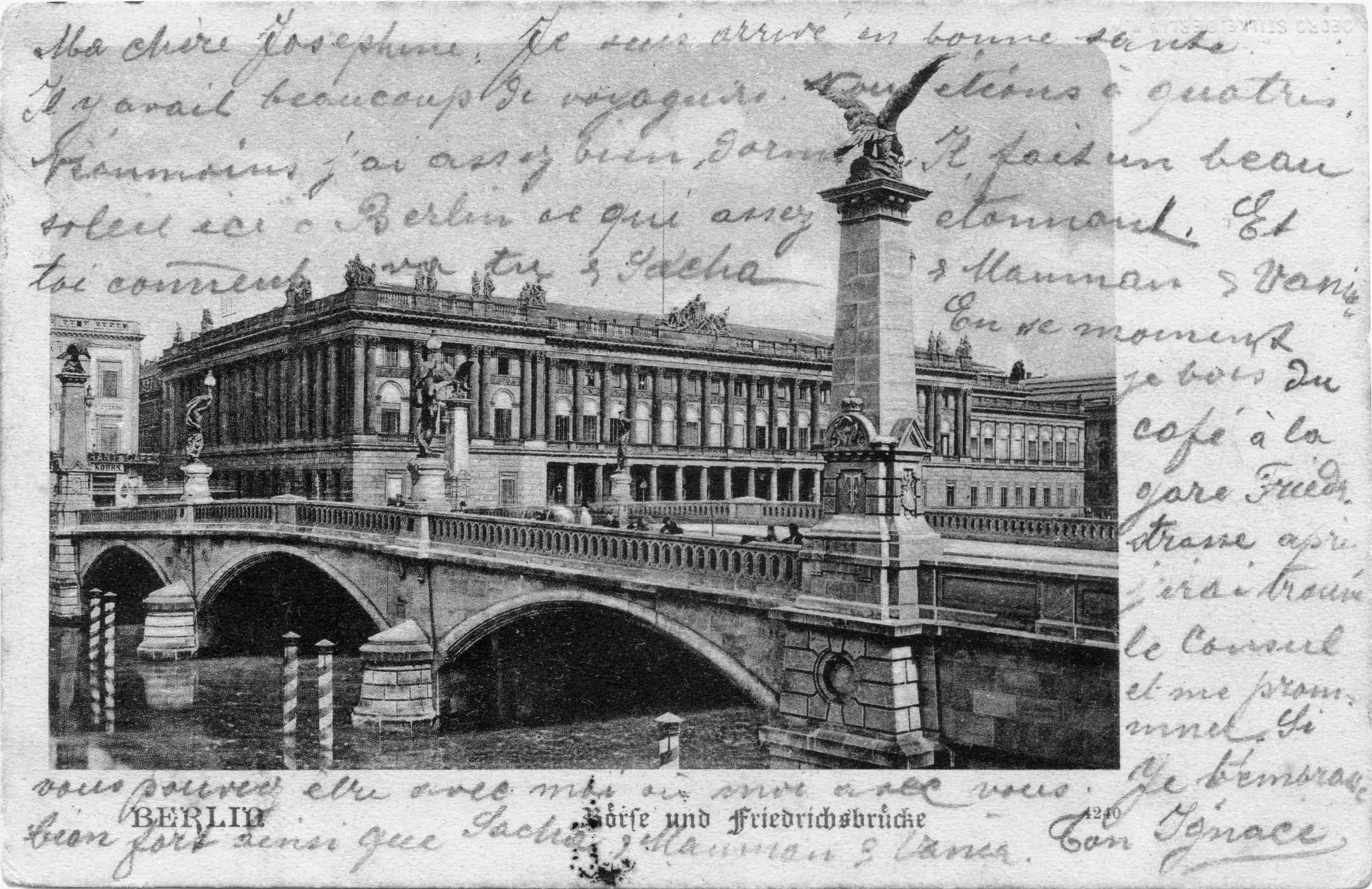
Exchange building at the Berlin Börse, circa 1900

== History ==
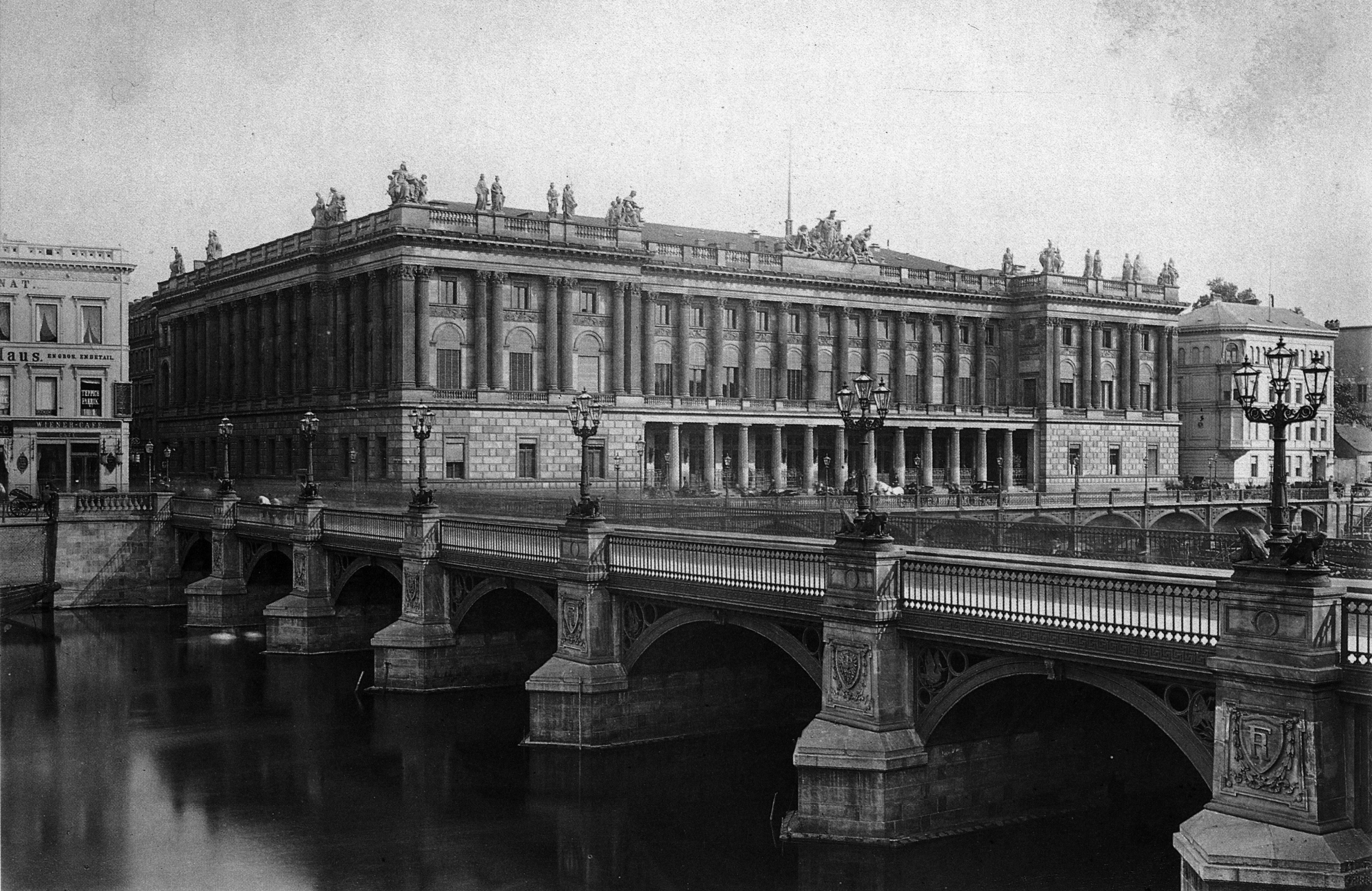
The former building of the Berlin Stock Exchange as it appeared in 1886

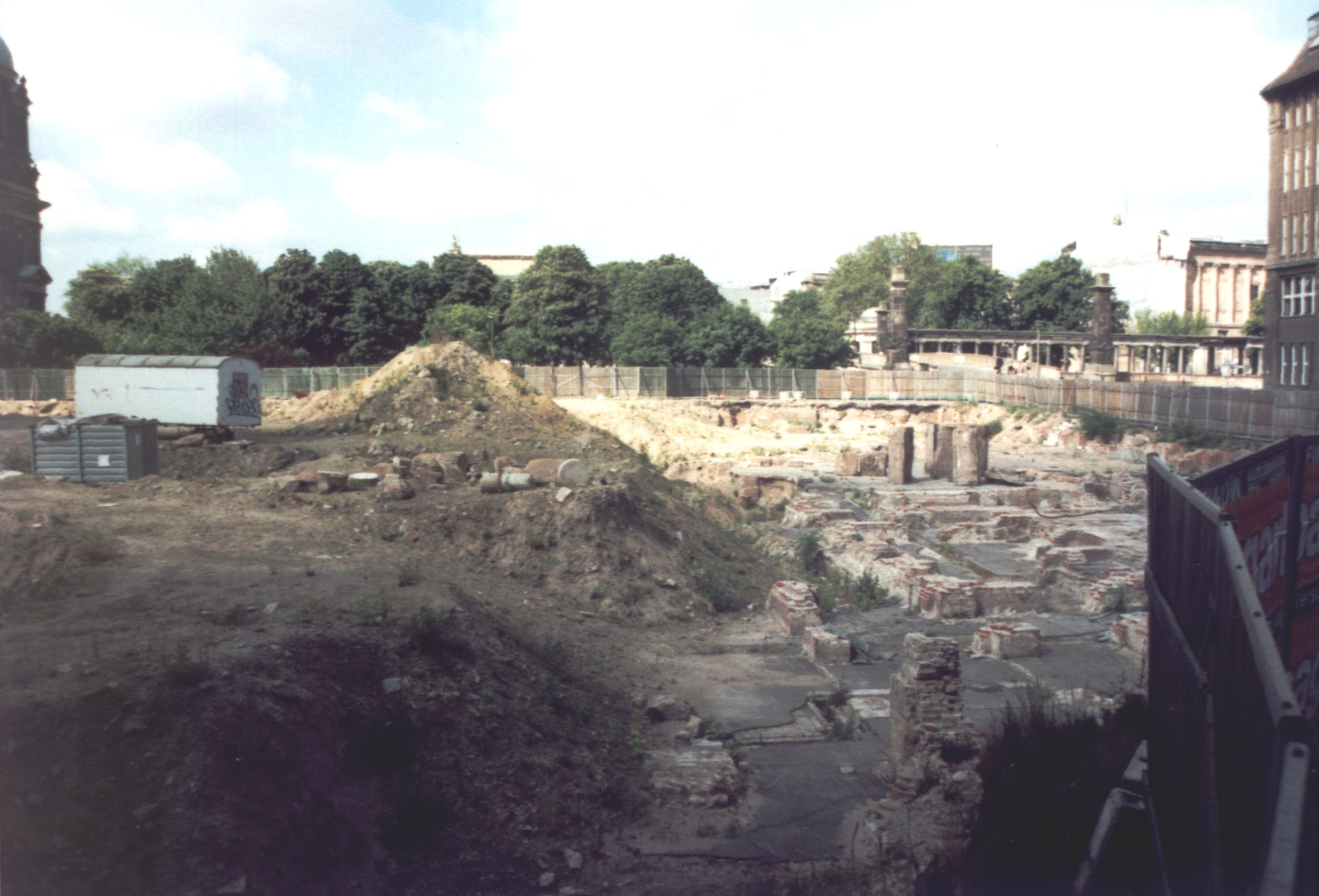
The remains of the Berlin Stock Exchange building in 1998

Although the Berlin Stock Exchange was established on June 29, 1685, by Elector Friedrich Wilhelm, the first securities trading did not occur until February 25, 1739. Trading initially took place on the upper floor of the Neues Lusthaus in central Berlin's Lustgarten, located near the Berlin Cathedral and the Berliner Stadtschloss. In 1798, this building was demolished and replaced with a new exchange building on the same site. In 1803, the United Stock Exchange Corporation assumed operations but was replaced again in 1820 by a newly established consortium of Berlin Merchants, known as the Berliner Kaufmannschaft, or Berlin Merchants' Association.

Between 1859 and 1863, architect Friedrich Hitzig designed a new building for the exchange at Burgstraße 25–26, on the opposite side of the Spree River. Opening on October 1, 1863, the exchange was informally referred to by its address as "Die Burgstraße". The construction cost was approximately 700,000 Vereinsthaler. Before the outbreak of World War I, the Berlin Stock Exchange was the largest stock exchange in Germany and was among the largest stock, bond, and commodity exchanges in the world, comparable in size to the London Stock Exchange and the New York Stock Exchange.

On Thursday, July 30, trading at the Burgstraße would close a day early following Russia’s general mobilization. Two days later, on Saturday August 1, The German Empire declared war on the Russian Empire. Normal commercial activity ceased as the state mobilized its resources and prepared to shift towards a war economy. As a result, all trading on the exchange was halted and would not resume until November 2, 1917, though under strict government controls.

In 1920, when the corporation of Berlin Merchants merged with the Berlin Chamber of Commerce, ownership of the stock exchange was transferred to the aforementioned Chamber of Commerce. In 1922, the first calculation of the Statistical Office's Stock Index was based on the average price level of approximately 300 representative shares of the Berlin Stock Exchange. The Wirtschaftsrundfunk, a business news radio broadcasting agency, maintained an office in the exchange building.

On May 13, 1927, in an event known as "Black Friday", the Berlin index lost 31.9% of its value, following attempts by Reichsbank President Hjalmar Schacht to impose limits on financial speculation. Black Friday began a downturn in German financial markets that would continue into the Great Depression. In 1926, 917 public companies were trading on the exchange, but by the end of 1932, only 659 remained. After the Nazis took over Germany, they sought to revitalize the German economy by implementing an authoritarian command economy and rearmament, but they were unable to reverse this trend. By 1943, the number of listed companies would drop to 450, less than half the amount listed eighteen years prior. That same year, economic pressures caused by the Second World War led the Reich Statistical Office (German: Statistische Reichsamt) to suspend all trading activity.

On May 24, 1944, the stock exchange building burned down following an air raid. The ruins of the exchange were demolished in the year 1957 and 1958. Remnants of the old building, such as pillars and façade pieces, were visible from behind a construction fence until new construction began in 2001.

=== Post-Second World War ===
On March 11, 1952, official trading reopened again in West Berlin, with meetings held in the Lodge House on Emser Straße until the completion of a new stock exchange building. Yet the physical and human costs wrought by the war's destruction meant that the Berlin stock market’s significance was greatly reduced from its pre-war status.

An architectural design competition was announced for both the Chamber of Commerce, Industry the stock exchange. The competition was won by architects Franz Heinrich Sobotka and Gustav Müller. The inauguration of the new building on the Fasanenstraße took place on June 18, 1955.

In response to growing internationalization and market consolidation during the mid-1990s, Börse Berlin began trading a broader range of foreign stocks and bonds.

In September 2007, Börse Berlin AG acquired a majority stake in EASDAQ NV, which operates under the Equiduct brand. The Equiduct marketplace was launched on March 20, 2009.

On July 21, 2009, Equiduct entered a strategic partnership with Citadel Securities, a division of Citadel Investment Group, L.L.C. The agreement between Citadel Securities and Börse Berlin AG provided funding for Equiduct to develop its platform. Equiduct is operated by Börse Berlin as part of the Berlin Second Regulated Market (B.S.R.M.), which was established in 2009.

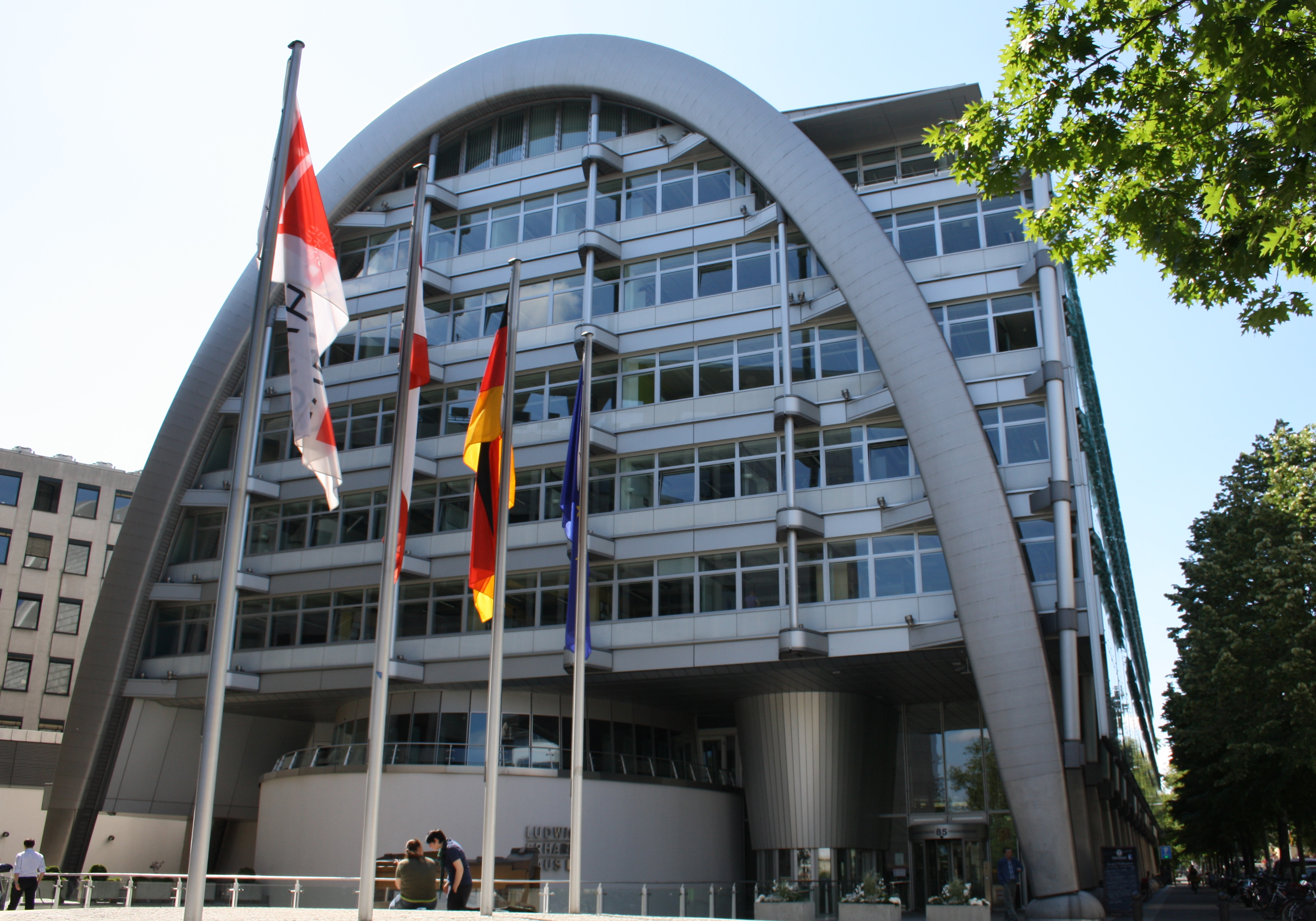
Börse Berlin headquarters from 1998-2022 in Ludwig-Erhard-Haus, designed by Nicholas Grimshaw

In October 2019, Tradegate Exchange GmbH, the stock exchange operator, announced the completion of a share deal to acquire 100 percent of the shares in Börse Berlin AG, the operating company of the traditional Berlin Stock Exchange and Equiduct. In return, the Verein Berliner Börse e.V., the previous owner of the Börse Berlin AG, received a stake in the Tradegate Exchange GmbH. Under the agreement, Tradegate Exchange, Börse Berlin, and Equiduct are operated jointly.

On August 1, 2020, the Exchange Council of Börse Berlin appointed Friederike von Hofe as the managing director of the exchange. Additionally, the supervisory board of the sponsoring company appointed von Hofe as a member of the executive board of Börse Berlin AG.

Until June 2022, Börse Berlin was headquartered in Ludwig-Erhard-Haus, a building designed by Nicholas Grimshaw at Fasanenstraße 85 in the Charlottenburg district. Since June 2022, Börse Berlin has been located at Kurfürstendamm.

== See also ==
- List of European stock exchanges
- List of major stock exchanges
- Wirtschaftswunder
