= Kruckow =

- Municipality
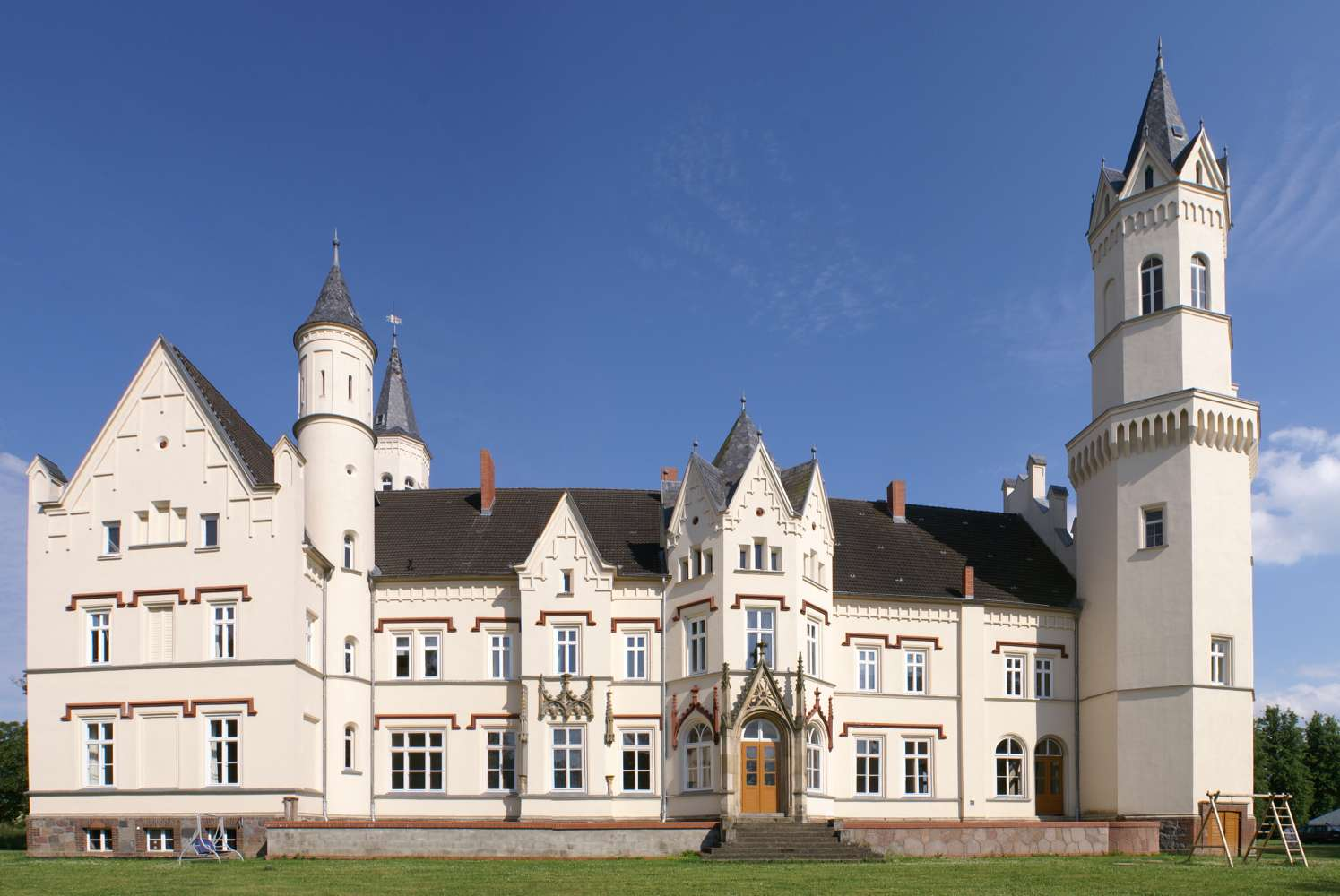
- Kartlow Castle in Kruckow

- Location of Kruckow within Vorpommern-Greifswald district
- Interactive map of Kruckow
- Location within Germany Location within Mecklenburg-Vorpommern
- Coordinates: 53°54′N 13°14′E
- Country: Germany
- State: Mecklenburg-Vorpommern
- District: Vorpommern-Greifswald
- Municipal assoc.: Jarmen-Tutow
- Subdivisions: 8

Government
  - Mayor: Vera Müncheberg

Area
  - Total: 35.54 km^{2} (13.72 sq mi)
- Elevation: 67 m (220 ft)

Population (2025-12-31)
  - Total: 644
  - Density: 18.1/km^{2} (46.9/sq mi)
- Time zone: UTC+01:00 (CET)
  - Summer (DST): UTC+02:00 (CEST)
- Postal codes: 17129
- Dialling codes: 039999
- Vehicle registration: DM
- Website: www.jarmen.de

Kruckow (German pronunciation: [ˈkʁʊkoː]) is a municipality in the Vorpommern-Greifswald district, in Mecklenburg-Vorpommern, Germany. It consists of the former municipalities of Borgwall, Heydenhof, Kartlow, Kruckow, Marienfelde, Schmarsow, Tutow-Dorf and Unnode. The municipality offers some important landmarks, such as the Renaissance/baroque Schmarsow Castle, the Neo Gothic Kartlow Castle, the ruin of Osten Castle or the Peter Joseph Lenné garden in Kruckow.
