= Remplin Palace =

Coordinates: 53°45′11″N 12°41′57″E

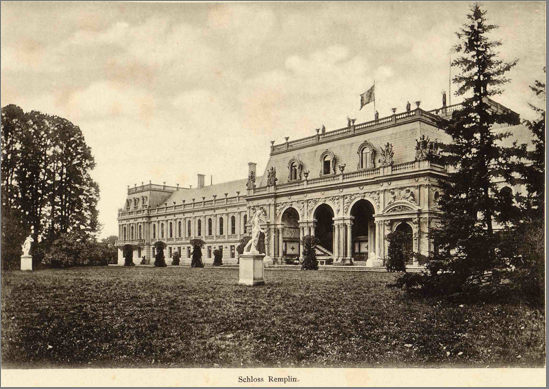
Remplin Palace around 1900

Remplin Palace (German: Schloss Remplin) is located in the village of Remplin, part of the municipality of Malchin in Mecklenburg-Vorpommern, Germany. The palace was one of the residences of the Grand Ducal family of Mecklenburg-Strelitz until it was destroyed by fire in 1940. Only the northern wing of the complex is remaining.

== History ==
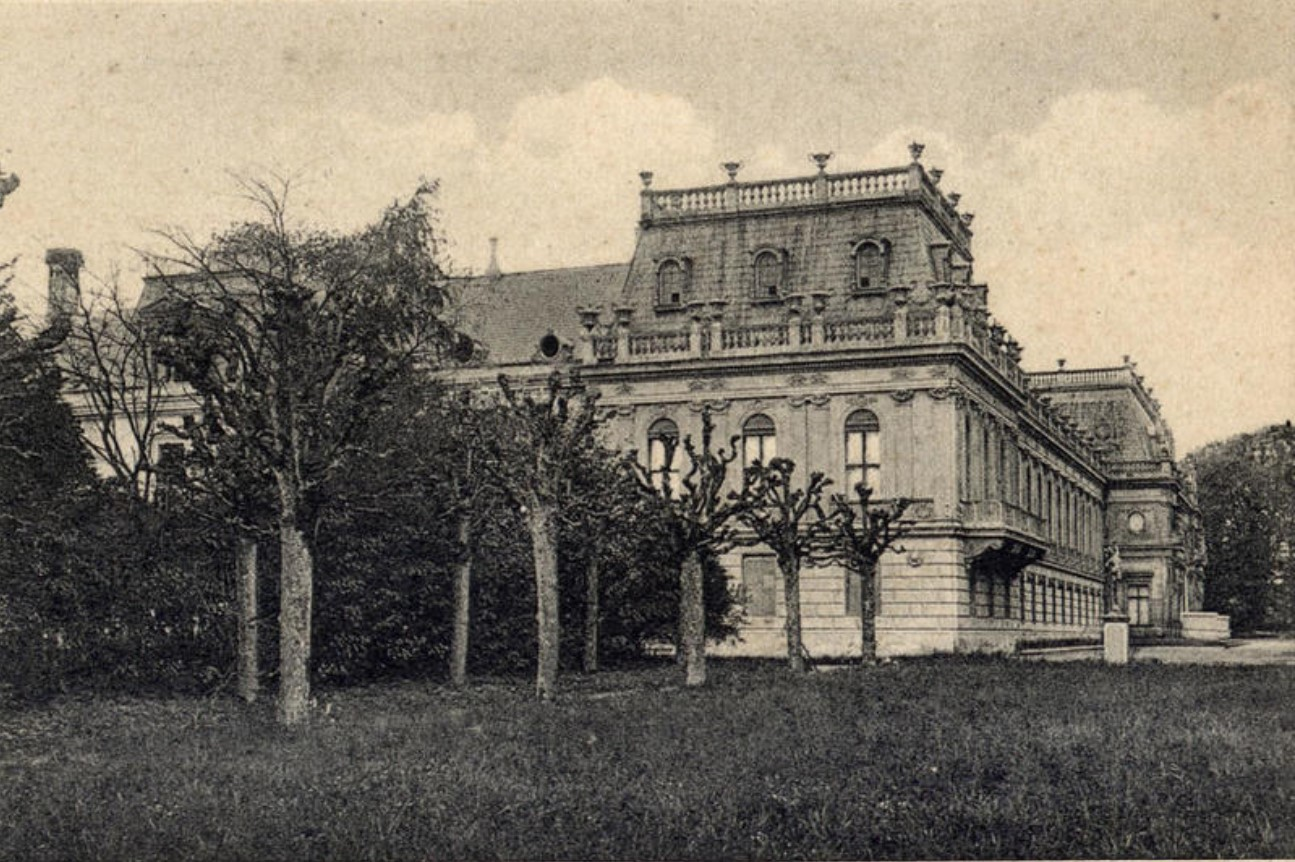
Remplin Palace (1928)

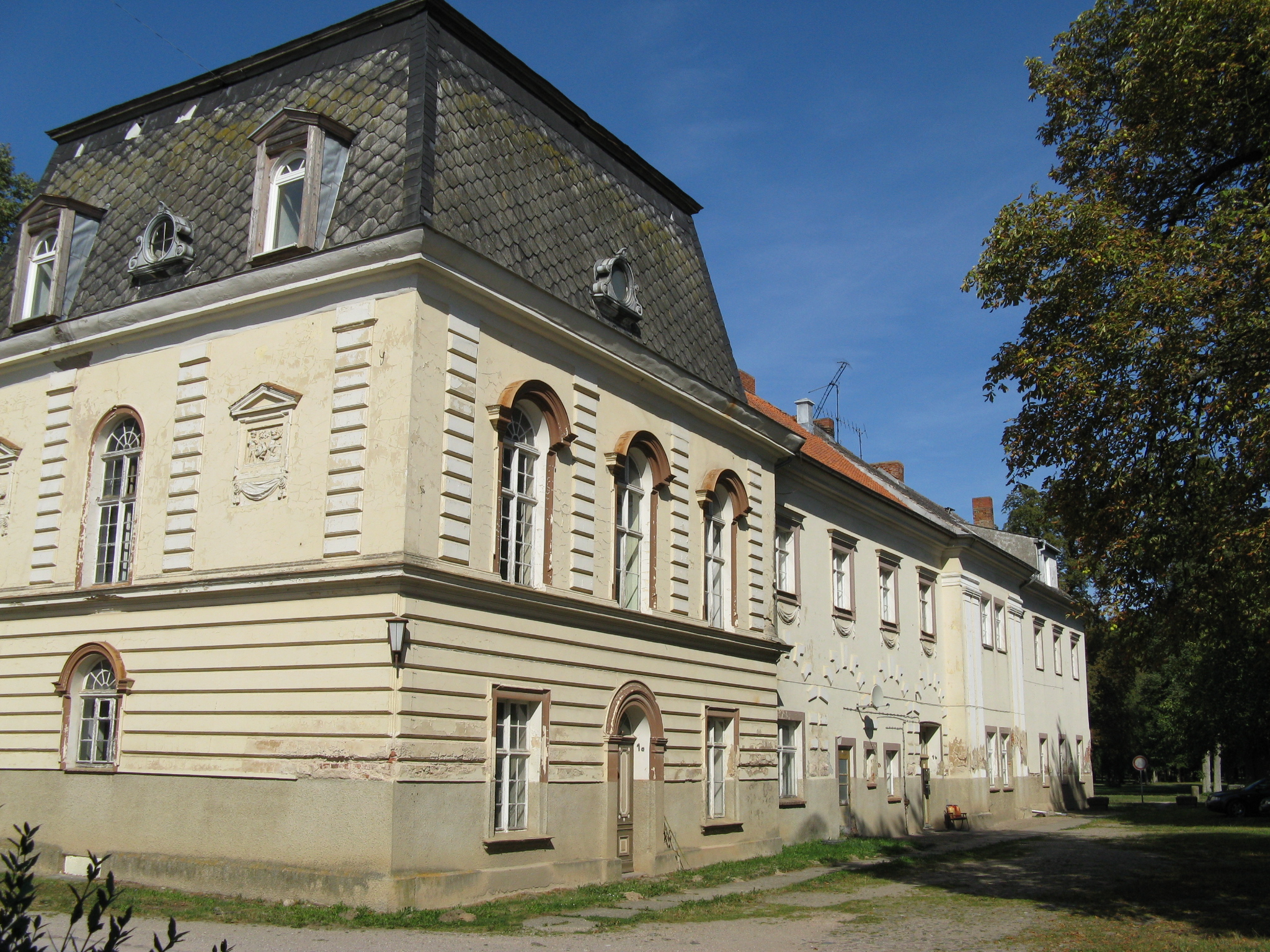
The remaining northern wing

=== Von Hahn family ===
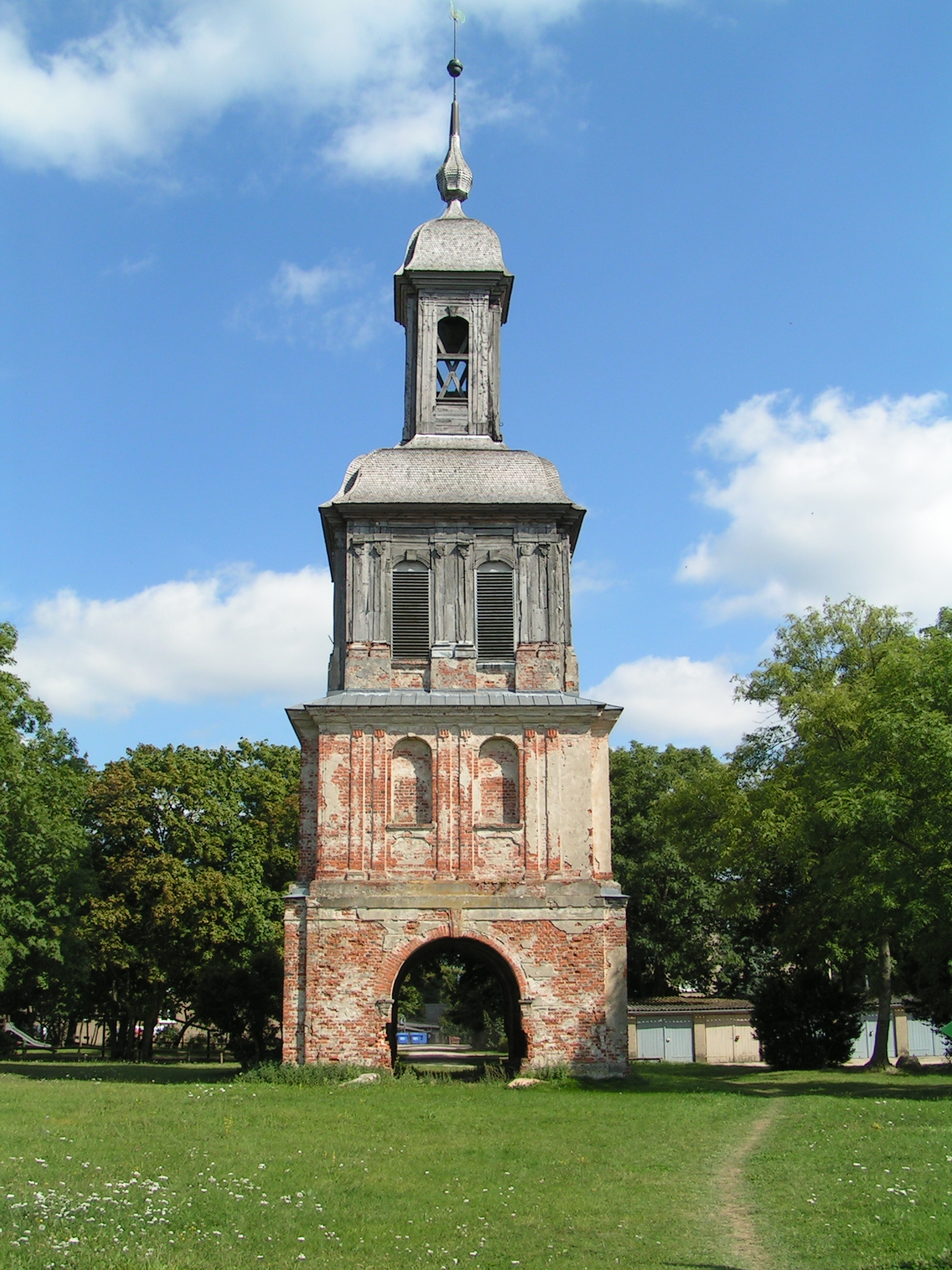
The gate tower

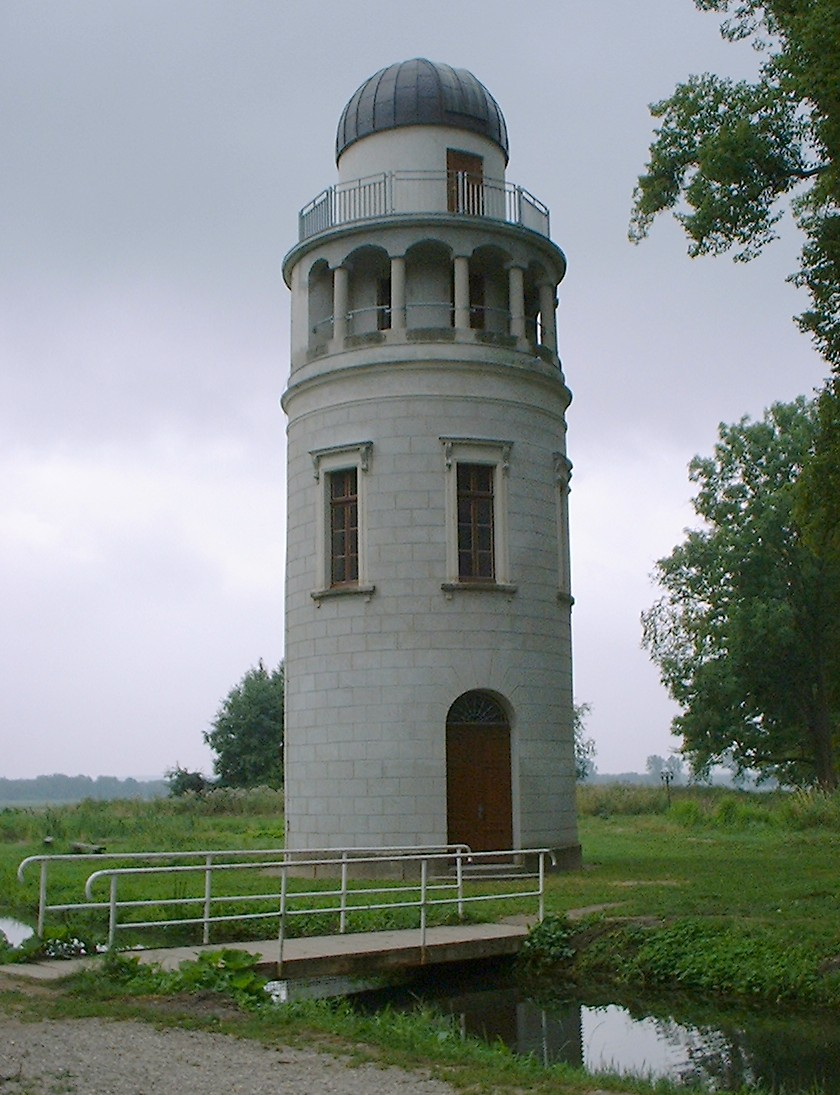
The observatory of count Frederick II von Hahn

The Remplin estate was owned by the noble von Hahn family as of 1405. The first building erected was a renaissance castle. During the 18th century, two wings were added and the castle was transformed into a baroque stately home with a large garden around it. Count Frederick II von Hahn was one of the richest men of Mecklenburg in his time and dedicated himself to the science and in particular astronomy. In the southern edge of the park, he erected around 1792 Mecklenburg's first observatory which was also at one point the third largest observatory outside of Great Britain. At the start of the 19th century, his son count Carl Friedrich von Hahn (also known as the 'theatre count'), became heavily indebted due to his love for the theatre and the stage. As a result, he had to sell his Remplin estate in 1816. The new owner was George William, Prince of Schaumburg-Lippe, who sold the house and estate to Karl von Maltzahn in 1848.

=== Duke George August of Mecklenburg-Strelitz ===
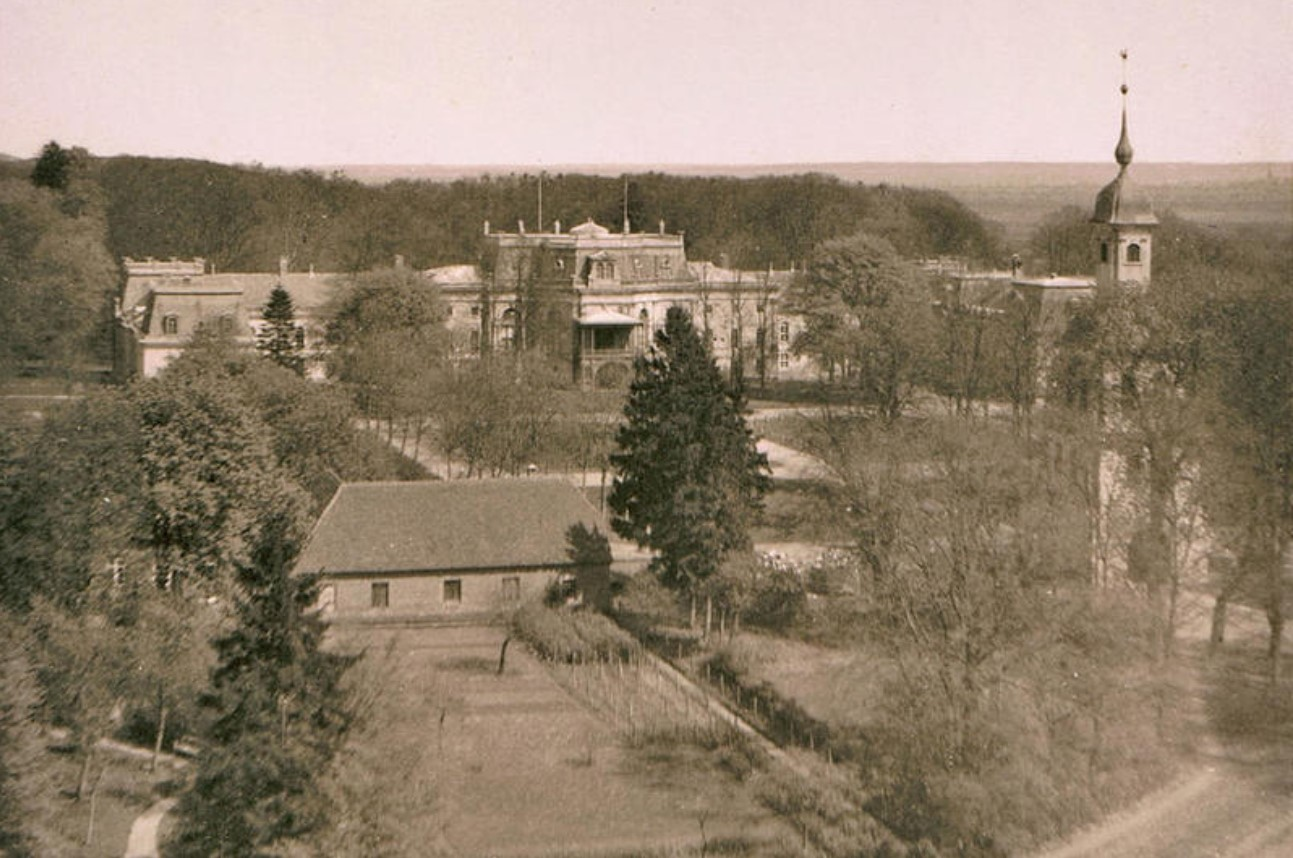
Remplin Palace (1930)

Duke George of Mecklenburg-Strelitz, the younger son of Grand Duke George, acquired the estate in 1852 on the occasion of his marriage to the Russian Grand Duchess Catherine Mikhailovna. They resided in Russia but used Remplin Palace as their residence on their visits to Mecklenburg. Starting from 1860, the 35 hectares baroque style park was transformed into an English landscape park with the help of the landscape architect Peter Joseph Lenné. Also, the architect Friedrich Hitzig, a pupil of Karl Friedrich Schinkel, transformed the house into a neo-Renaissance style palace. After the completion, the central Corps de Logis was decorated with a magnificent, arcaded loggia. Works of art and furniture were mostly acquired from Italy and France for the decoration of the interior.

One entered the palace through a large marble domed hall, from where the visitor could go into the gallery with furniture by André Charles Boulle. To the right, the gallery connected into the oak room, the souvenir room (German: das Andenkenzimmer), and the red dining room. To the left, the gallery connected to paintings room, the music room with two Blüthner grand pianos, where Robert Schumann and Pyotr Ilyich Tchaikovsky gave their performances, the tea room, and the yellow dining room. The library contained around 12,000 volumes, of which parts could be traced back to the collection of count Friedrich Hahn. The palace also contained chapels for the three different confessions of the Grand Ducal family: Russian, Roman Catholic and Evangelic. The southern wing of the palace contained the private apartments of the family as well as the stables. While the northern wing contained the rooms for the servants, the laundrette and the garage.

=== Duke Charles Michael of Mecklenburg-Strelitz ===
With the death of his mother, Duke Charles Michael inherited the palace in 1894. He and his family used the palace on an occasional basis when the family was on visit from Russia. The primary residences were their Saint Petersburg palace and the Oranienbaum summer palace on the Gulf of Finland. In Remplin, the duke received many guests like the German emperor Wilhelm II in December 1891. Only when the Grand Ducal family was forced to leave Russia after the Revolution and lost all their (Russian) properties, they took up permanent residence in Remplin. Duke Charles Michael passed away in Replin in 1934, unmarried. He adopted his nephew as successor.

=== Duke George of Mecklenburg-Strelitz ===
After the death of his uncle, Duke George inherited the palace and estate in 1934. He suffered persecution from the Nazis due to his dynastical links to Russia and his political Catholicism. Under threat of expropriation, he was forced to sell most of his land and forests. At the start of World War II, all that remained was the palace itself and 30 hectares of land around it.

The palace was destroyed by a fire in only two hours in the evening of 10 April 1940. Newspaper reports from the time suggest that a chimney fire was responsible for the accident. However, an arson attack instigated by local members of the Nazi party is probably the true cause, but could never be proven. The fire reduced the main building to the ground as the Nazis prevented fire fighters to their work, the Malchin fire brigade had apparently no fuel available to come to help. Only the northern wing was saved from destruction. Most of the art collection and the library was lost, including paintings by Franz Xaver Winterhalter and François Boucher, and mail correspondence between Johann Wolfgang von Goethe and queen Louise of Prussia.

The Grand Ducal family was forced to leave Remplin for Berlin, where they lived until their home was destroyed in an Allied bombing raid in February 1944. Duke George was arrested by the Gestapo and sent to the concentration camp in Sachsenhausen where he remained until 1945. After World War II, the family was expropriated by the Communist regime of the DDR and lost everything they had. They left for Sigmaringen in South-Western Germany. A reconstruction of the palace was never considered.

=== 21st century ===
In 2004, the Grand Ducal family completed the restitution process with the state which had been ongoing since 1990. The family regained ownership of land and buildings in Remplin. As the remaining north wing of the palace was so badly damaged and the extensive costs of restoration work were beyond the private funds available, the Grand Ducal family made the difficult decision to sell the Remplin palace by auction in March 2019.

== Bibliography ==
- Wolfgang Fuhrmann: "Geheimnisvolles Ende eines Adelssitzes : im April 1940 zerstörte ein Großfeuer das Schloss Remplin" in Nordkurier / Neubrandenburger Zeitung / Stadt Neubrandenburg und Burg Stargard (2019)
- Neidhardt Krauß: "Schloss Remplin" in "Baltische Studien / Gesellschaft für Pommersche Geschichte, Altertumskunde und Kunst." Volume 79, Kiel 1993 (pp. 72–75)
- Georg Alexander Herzog zu Mecklenburg: Das Haus Mecklenburg-Strelitz und seine Schlösser in Bruno J. Sobotka/ Jürgen Strauss: "Burgen, Schlösser, Gutshäuser in Mecklenburg-Vorpommern." Theiss Verlag, Stuttgart 1993. ISBN 3-8062-1084-5 (pp. 59–65)
- Torsten Foelsch: Das Residenzschloß zu Neustrelitz. Ein verschwundenes Schloß in Mecklenburg. Foelsch & Fanselow Verlag, Groß Gottschow 2016. ISBN 978-3-9816377-1-7. - Although the book primarily covers the Neustrelitz palace, several sections are dedicated to the Remplin Palace

== Aerial views of Schloss Remplin (1930s) ==
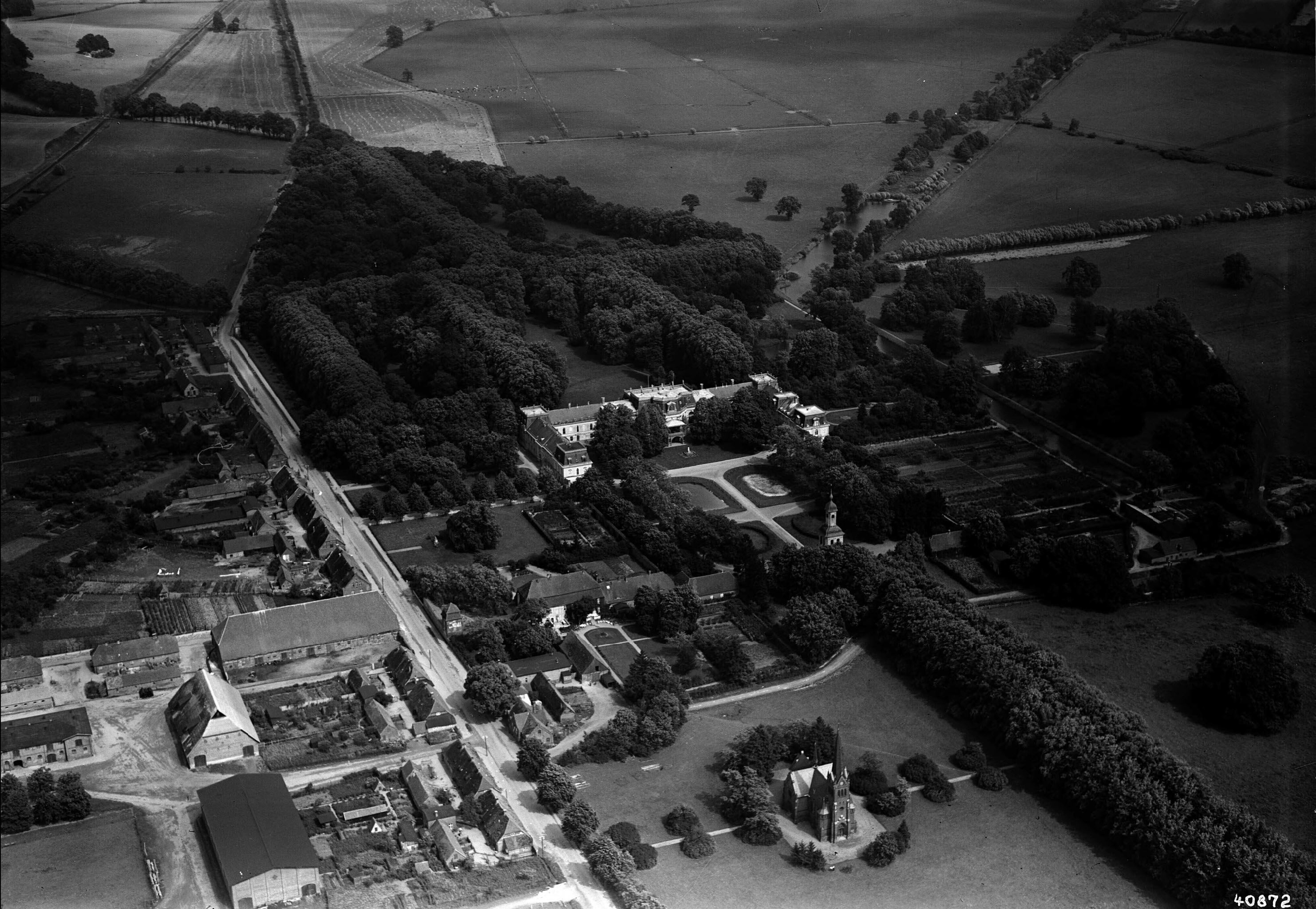

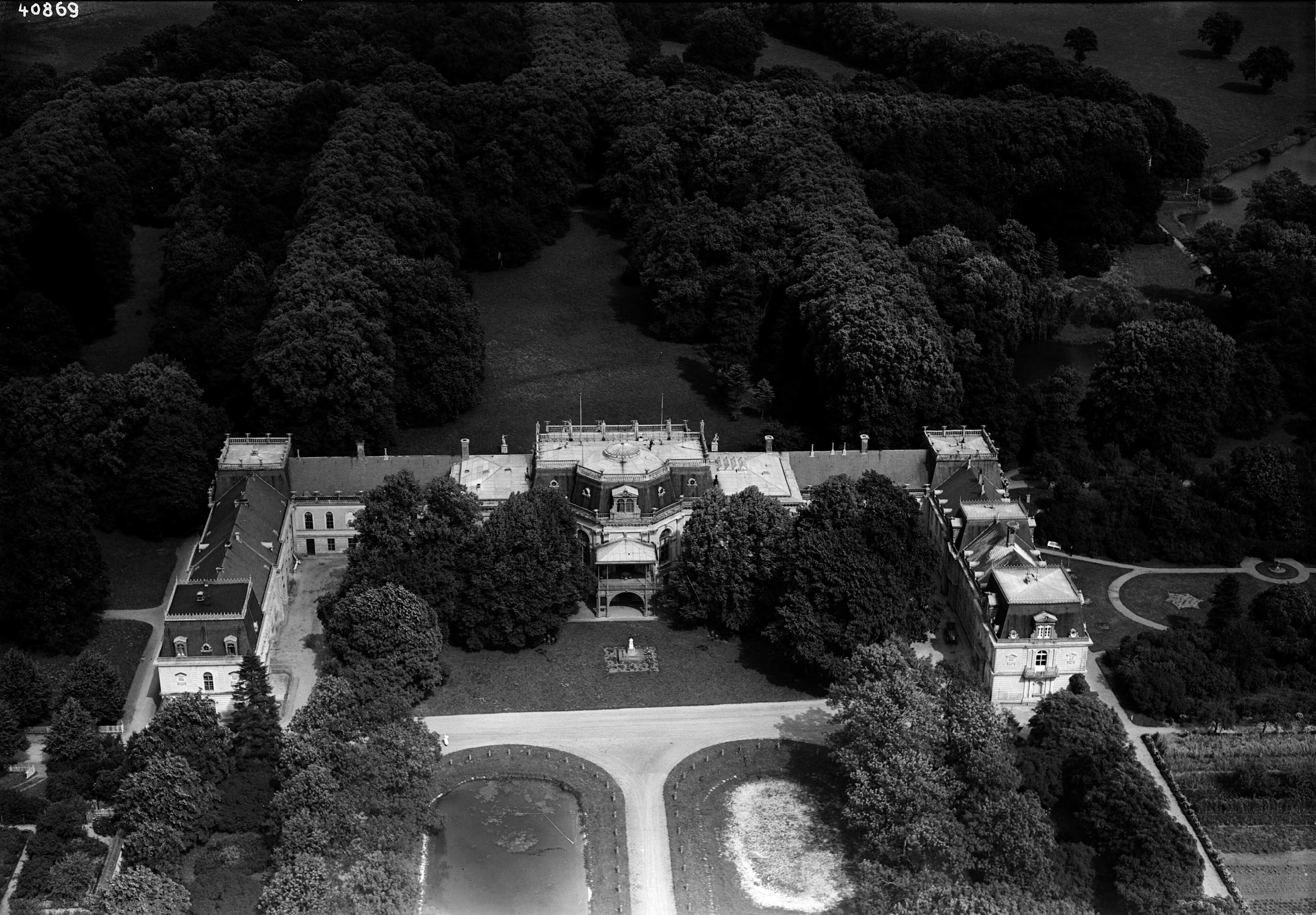

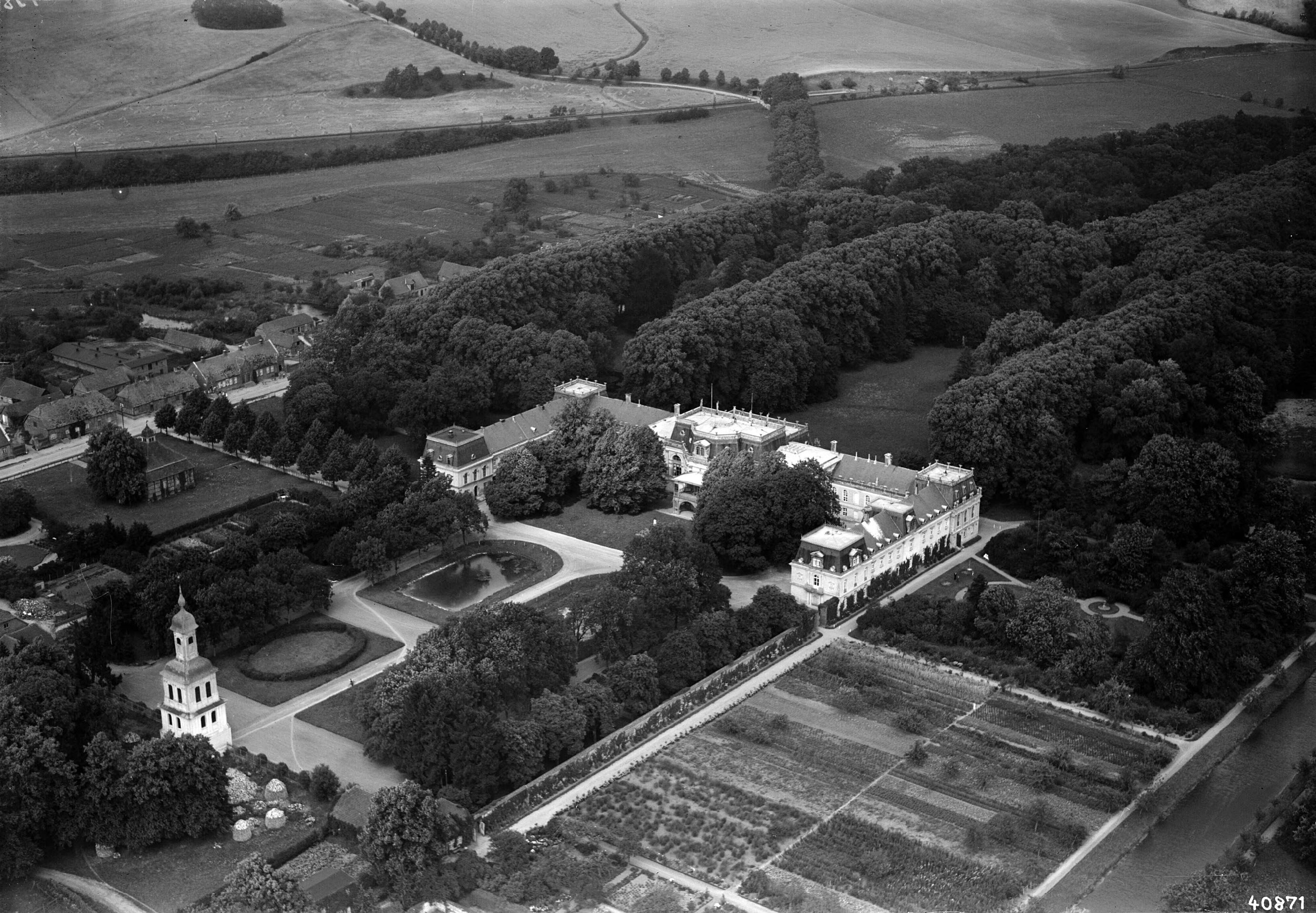

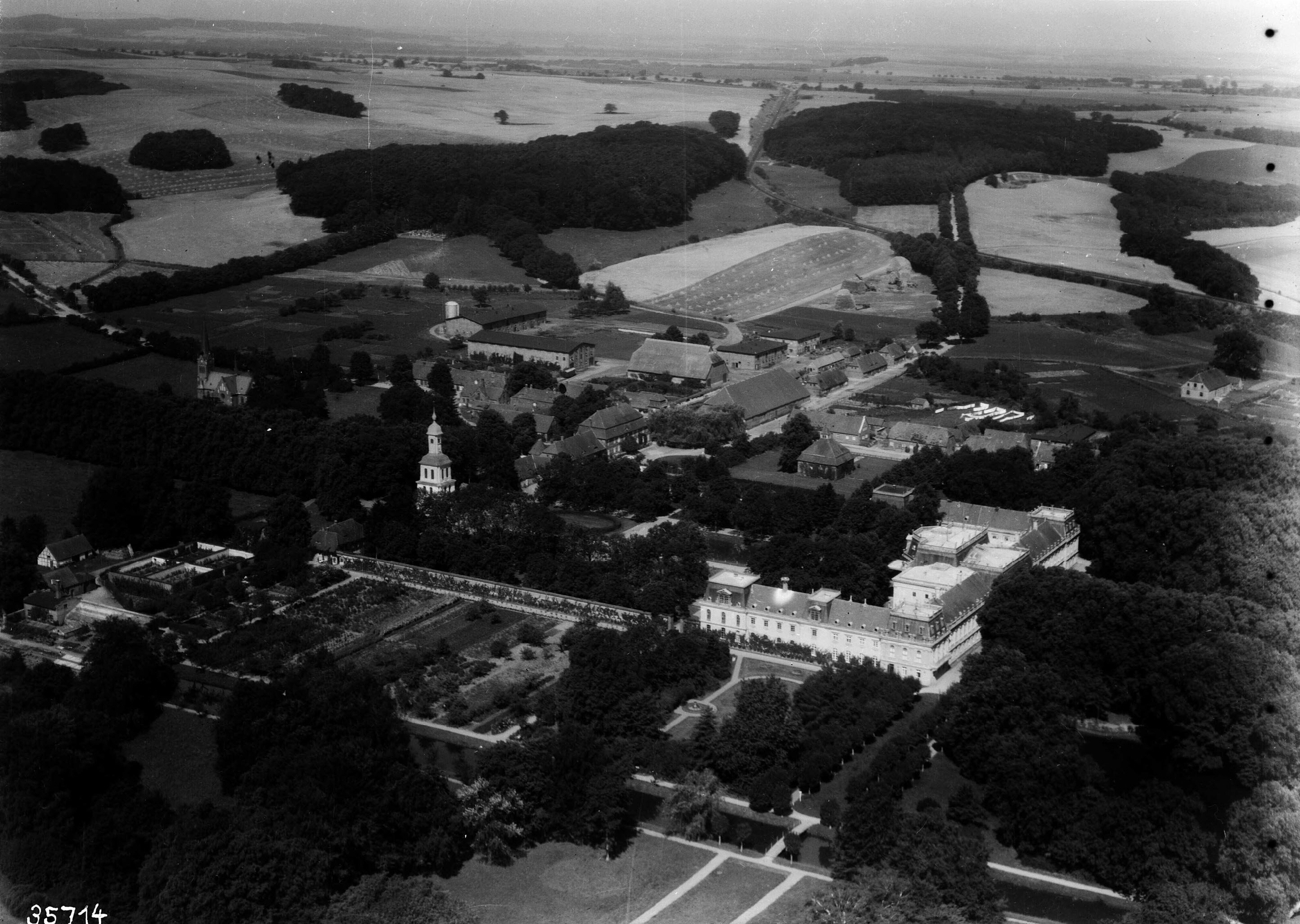

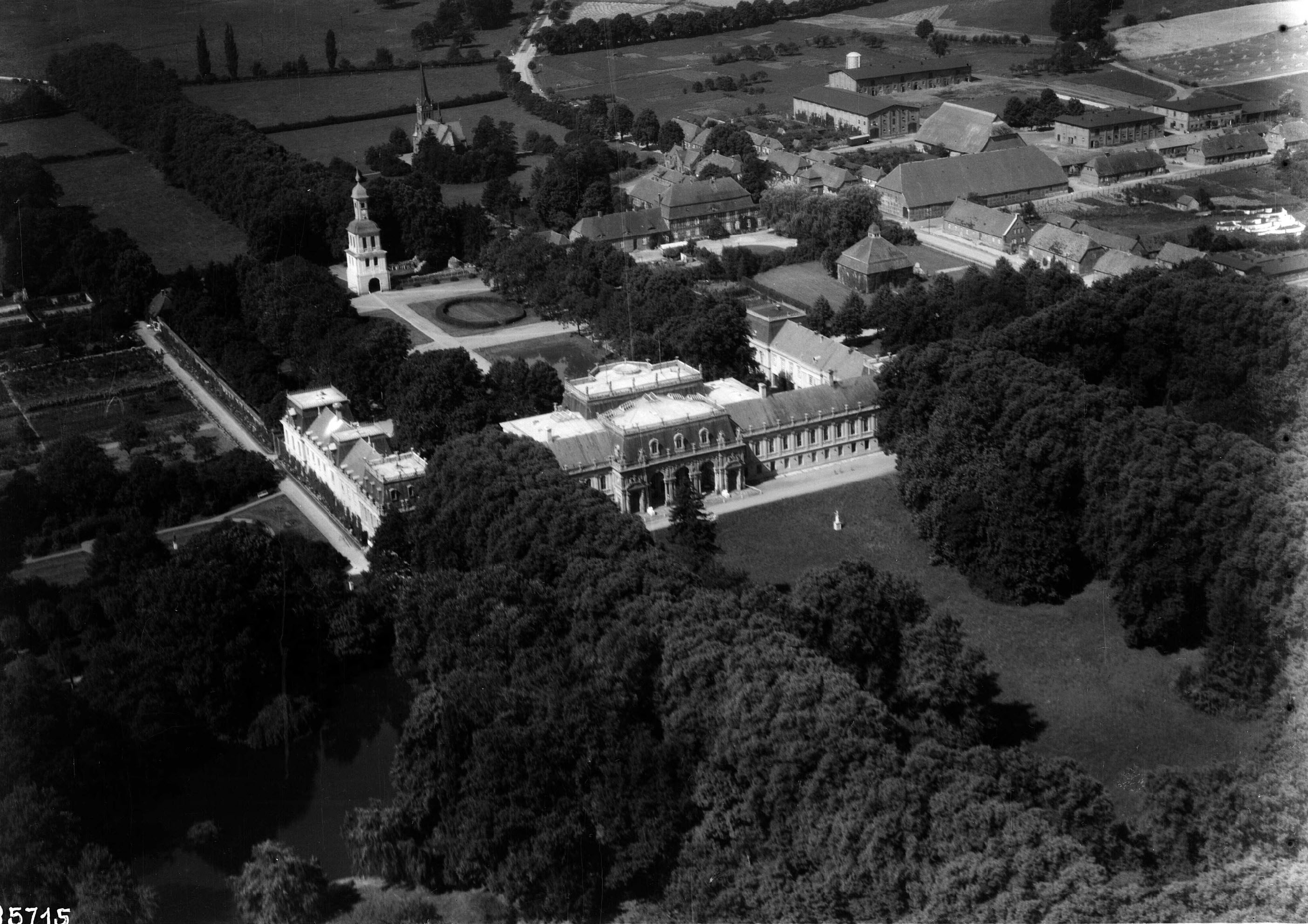

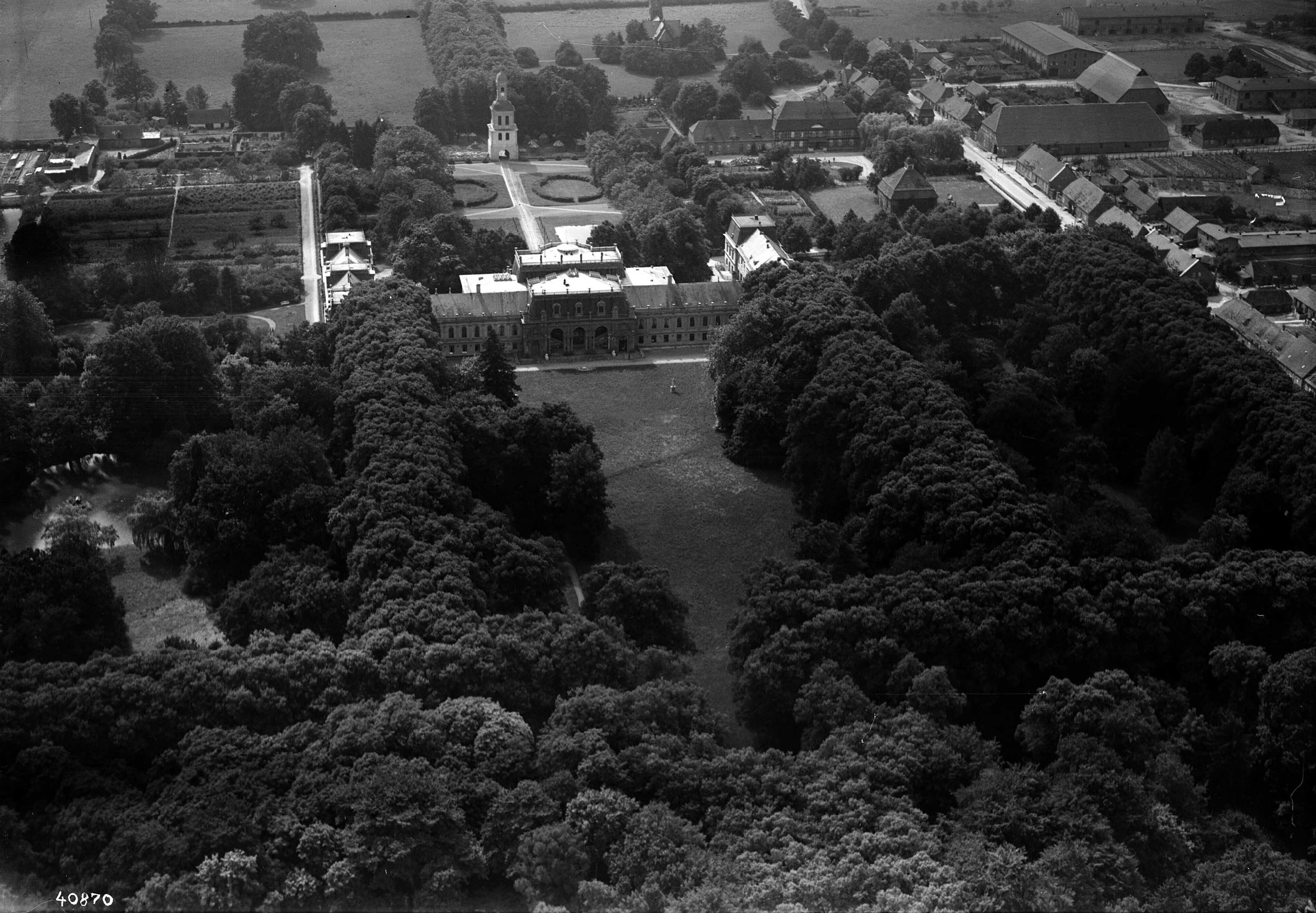

== Interior of Schloss Remplin ==
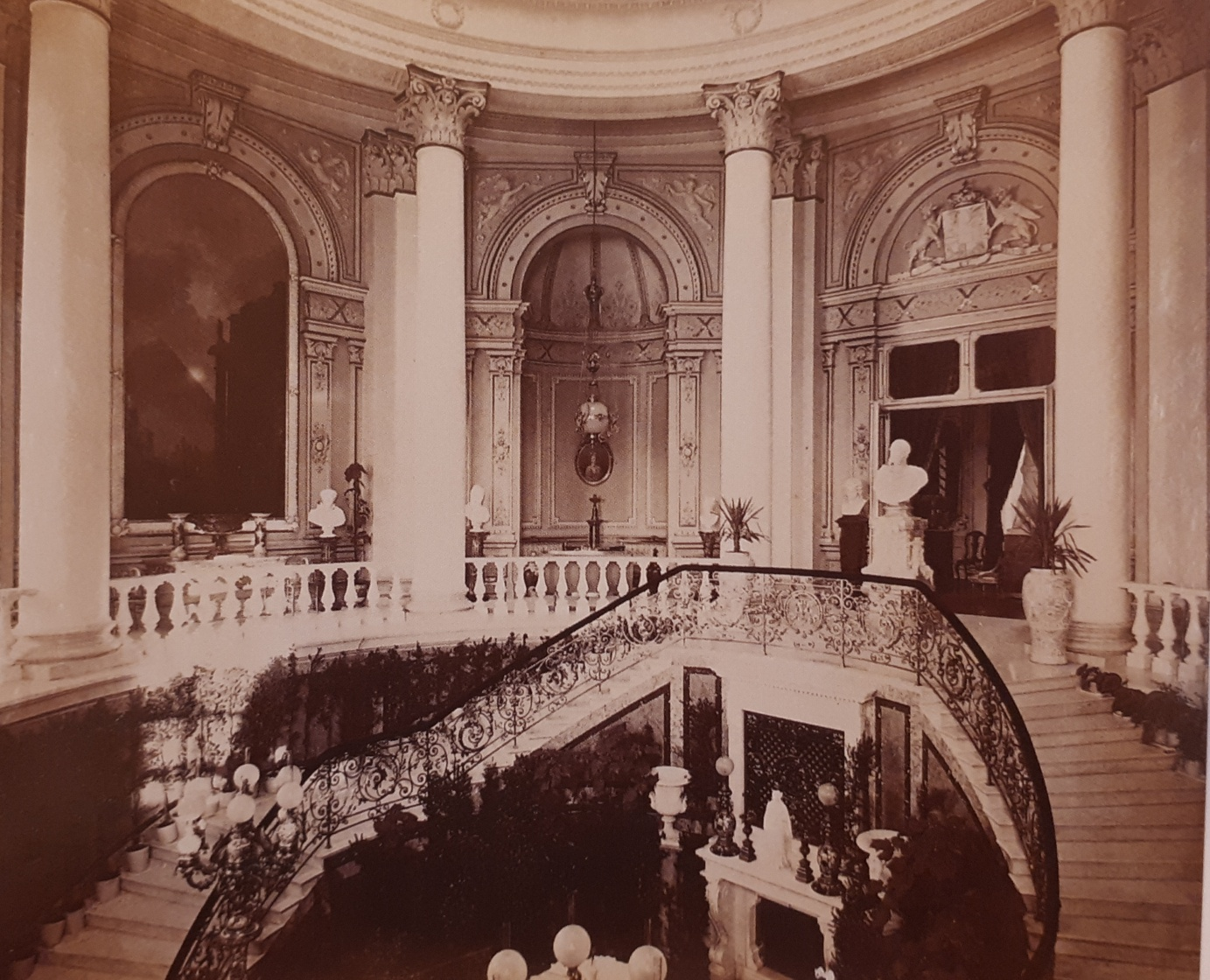
The Entrance hall

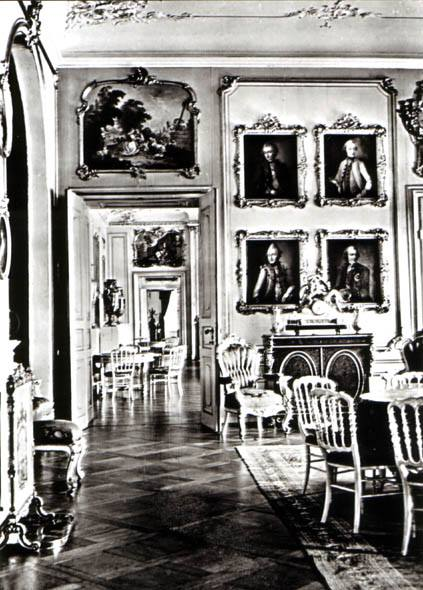
The Ancestors hall (Ahnensaal)

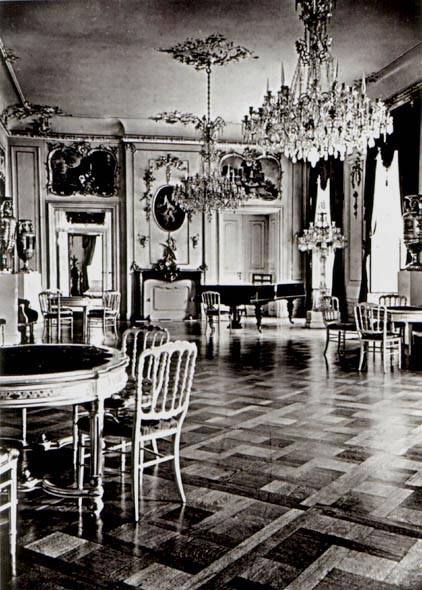
The Music room
