= Schloss Kartlow =

- Kruckow, Mecklenburg-Vorpommern
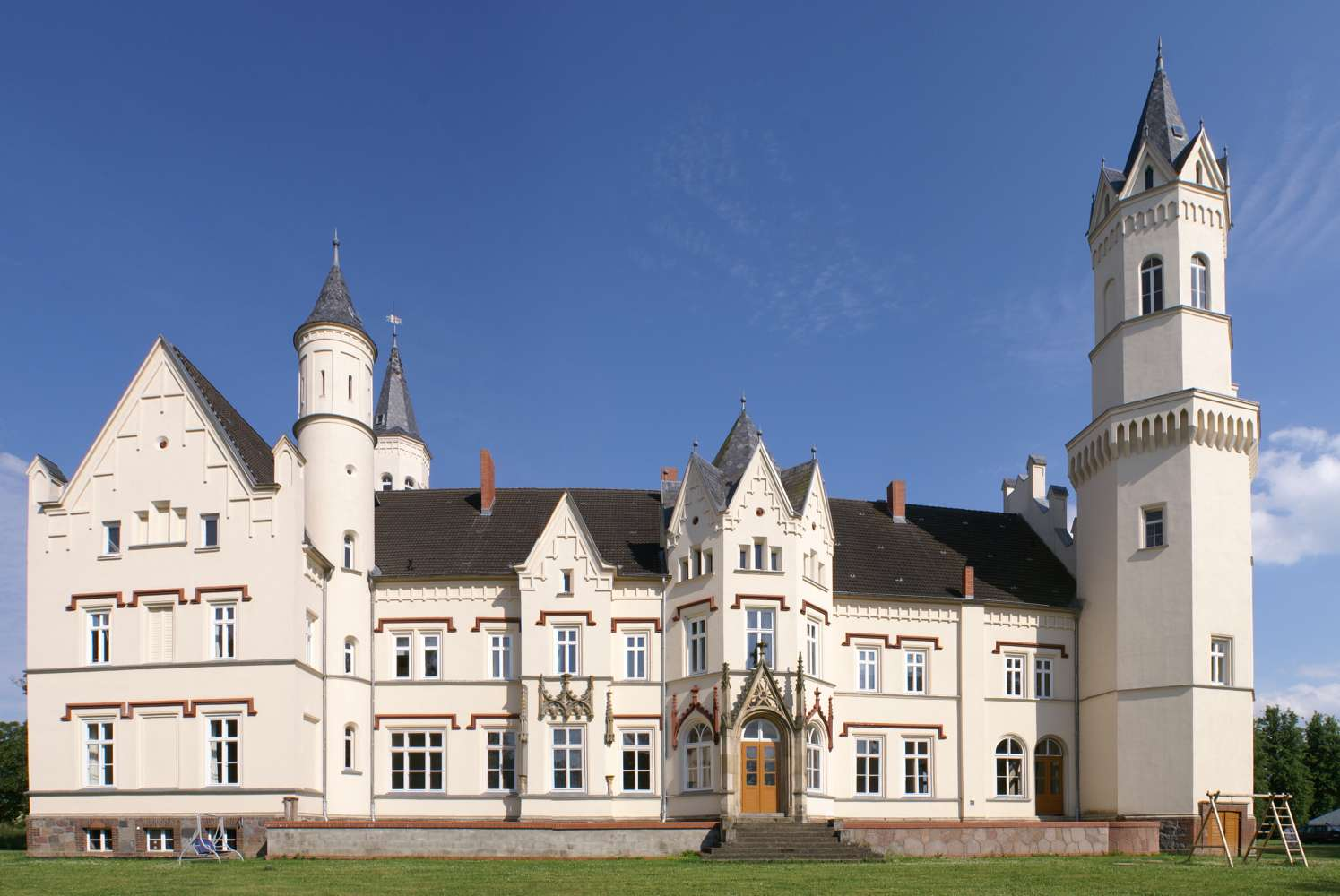
- Schloss Kartlow

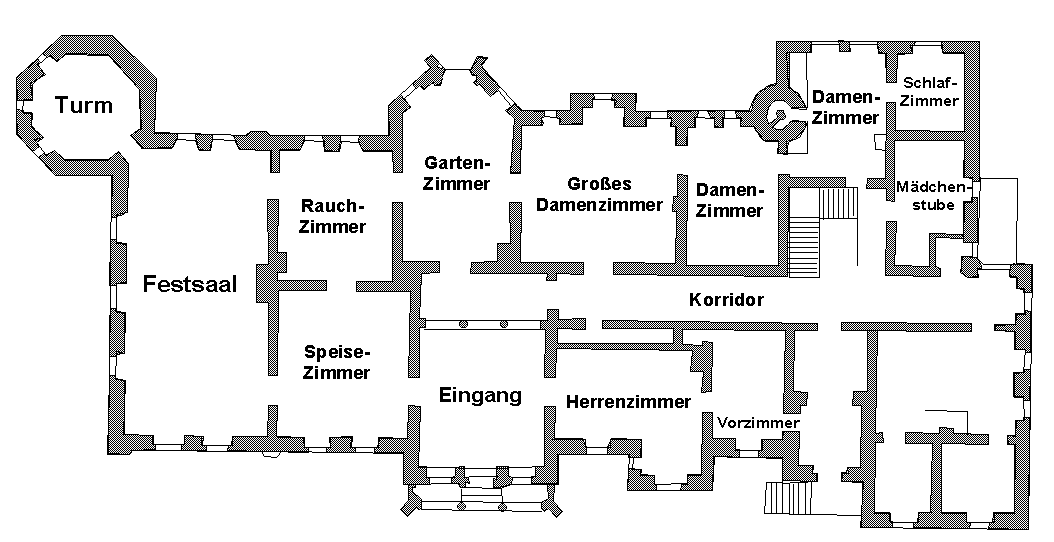
- Floor plan of main floor

Site information
- Type: Schloss

Location
- Location in Germany
- Coordinates: 53.893056°N 13.2675°E

Site history
- Built: 1853-58
- Built by: Woldemar von Heyden

Schloss Kartlow (German pronunciation: [ˈʃlɔs ˈkaʁtloː]) is a Gothic Revival Schloss in Kruckow municipality, Germany.

== History ==
The presently visible building was erected in 1853 to 1858 and designed by architect Friedrich Hitzig. It was built for Woldemar von Heyden on land that had belonged to the von Heyden family since 1292. It stayed in the family until 1945. During the East German era, the castle was expropriated and used as a school, a local store and for residential use. Renovation of the castle started during the East German era and continued after the German reunification. It is today private property.

== Architecture ==
The design is said to have been loosely inspired by the French Château de Chambord. A set of notable original wall decorations have been preserved in the main hall of the castle. The park surrounding the castle, laid out at the time of the construction of the castle but subsequently much altered, was designed by Peter Joseph Lenné.
