= Jewel Palace (Berlin) =

German palace

Coordinates: 52°30′45.914″N 13°24′10.098″E

- Juwel-Palais
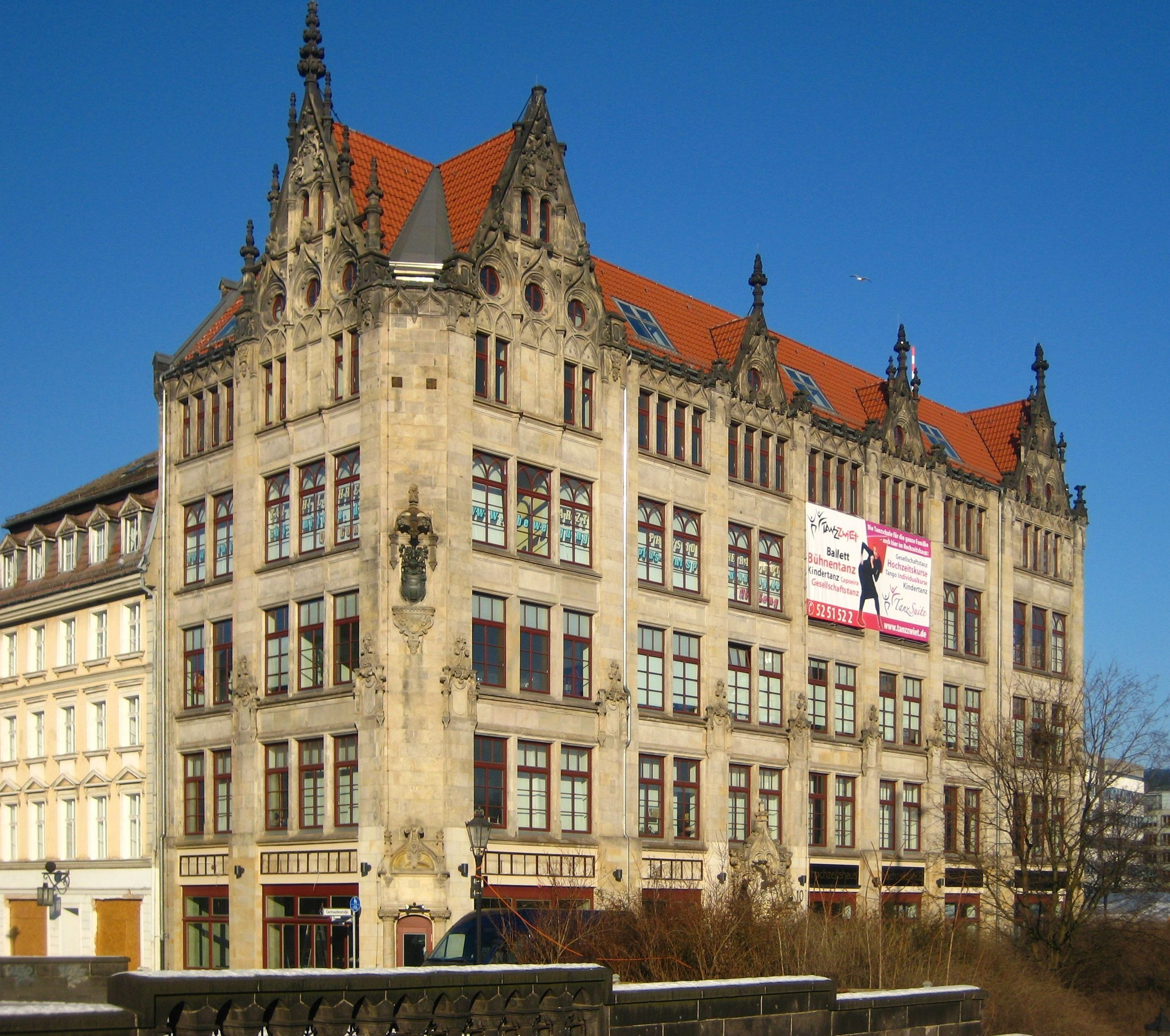
- Jewel Palace, 2009
- Interactive map of the Jewel Palace area

General information
- Type: Palace
- Architectural style: Neo-Gothic
- Construction started: 1894
- Completed: 1898

Design and construction
- Architects: Max Jacob, Georg Roensch

The Jewel Palace (German: Juwel-Palais) is a Neo-Gothic-style building in Berlin-Mitte. Designed by the architects Max Jacob and Georg Roensch, the palace was completed in 1898. The name of the building derives from its former function as a trading house, specialized in gold. Surviving World War II without considerable damages, several offices began to house in the Jewel Palace. After the German reunification the palace was essentially renovated.

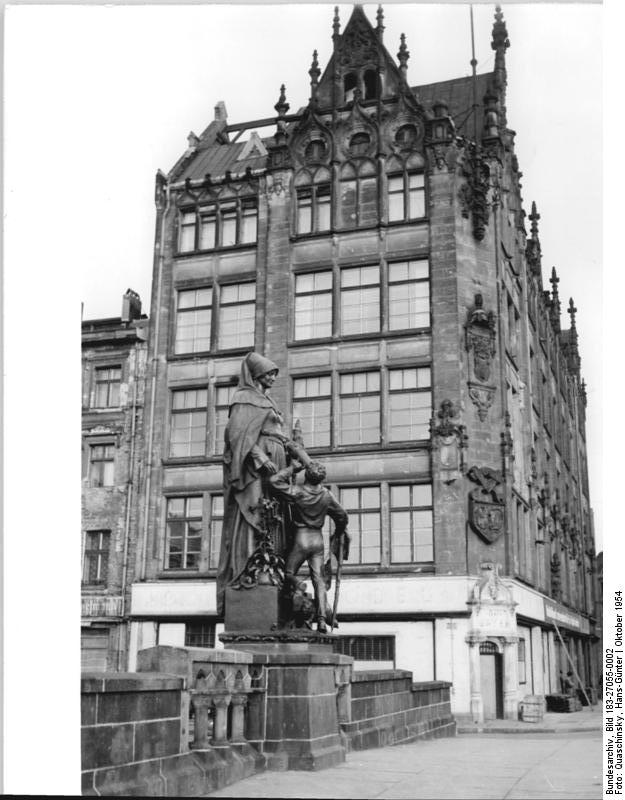
Bronze statue of Gertrude von Nivelles

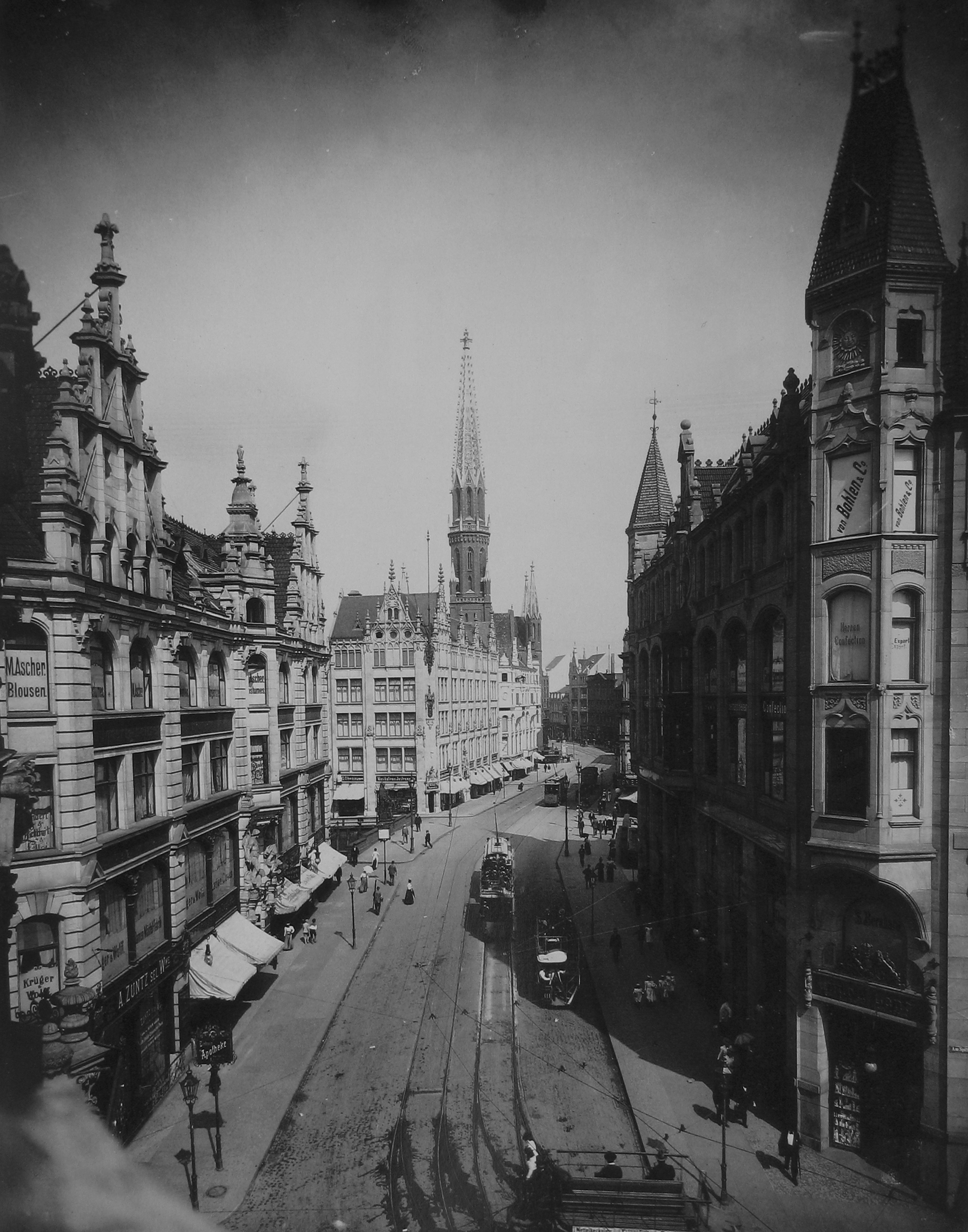
Gertrauden Street

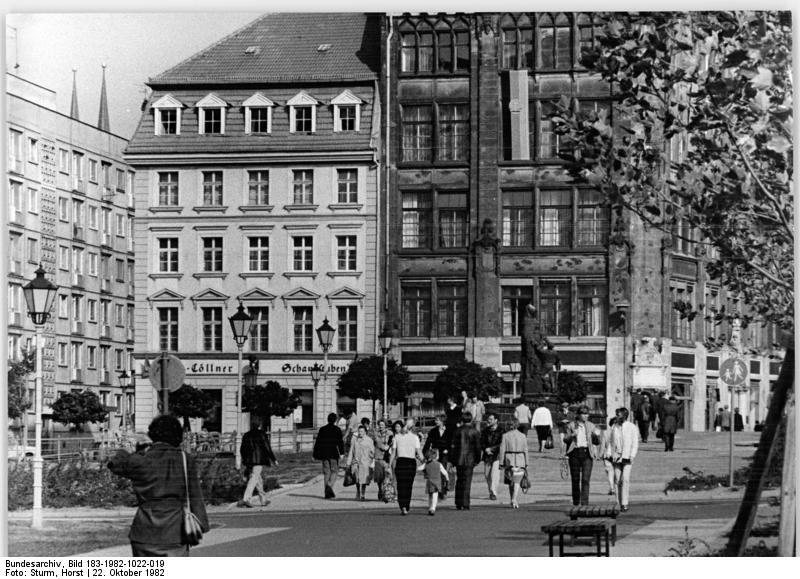
Gertrauden Bridge
