= House Order of the Wendish Crown =

Order of the Grand Duchy of Mecklenburg

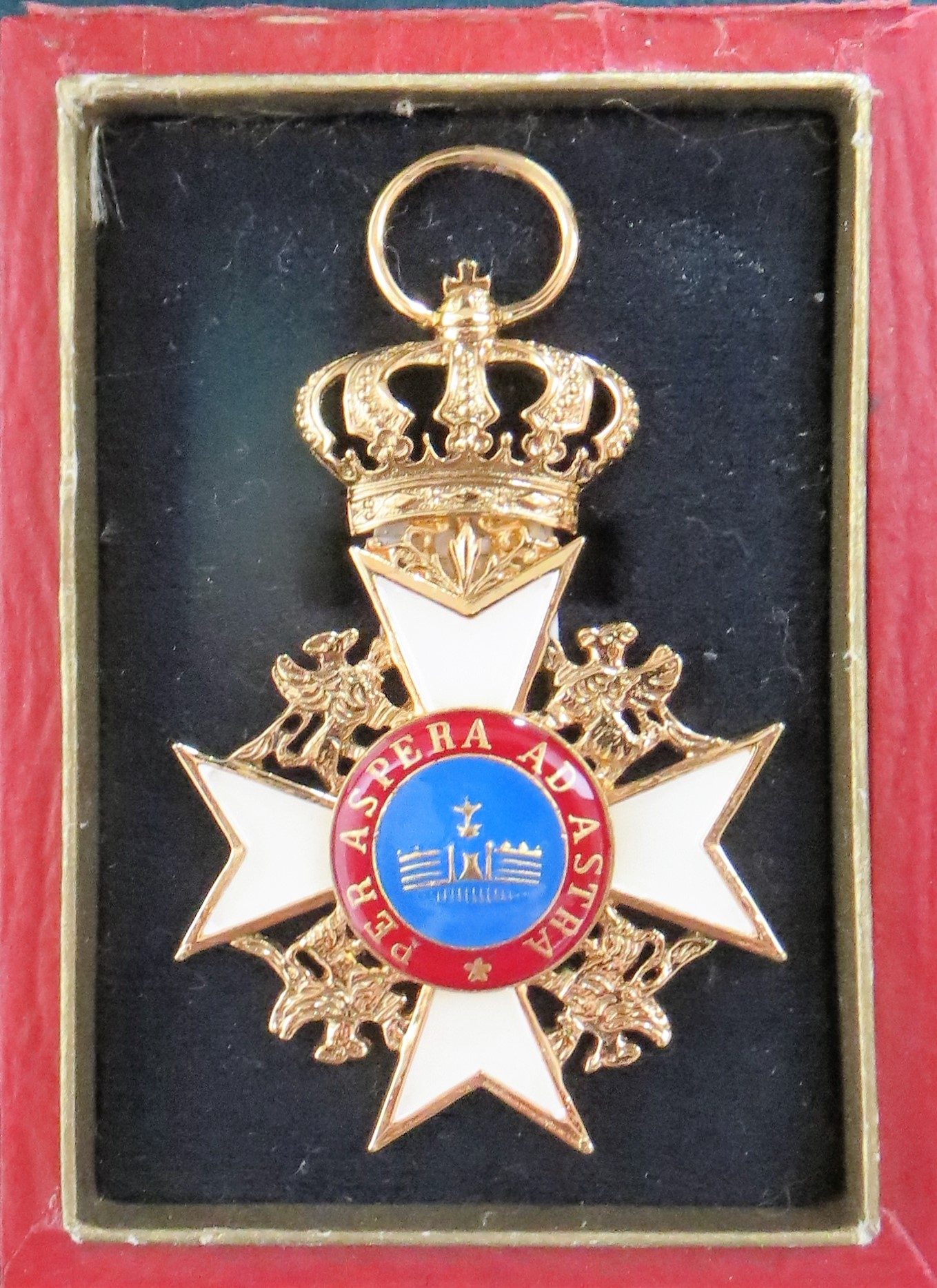
- Badge of the Order

Awarded by the House of Mecklenburg
- Type: House Order
- Royal house: House of Mecklenburg
- Ribbon: Light blue with inner yellow and outer red side stripes
- Motto: Per aspera ad astra
- Status: Currently constituted
- Head: Borwin, Duke of Mecklenburg

Precedence
- Next (higher): Order of the Griffon
- Ribbon of the Order

The House Order of the Wendish Crown (German: Hausorden der Wendischen Krone) is a dynastic order that was jointly instituted on 12 May 1864 by Grand Duke Friedrich Franz II of Mecklenburg-Schwerin and Grand Duke Friedrich Wilhelm of Mecklenburg-Strelitz. It is the oldest and most senior order of the House of Mecklenburg.

== Classes ==
The Order has four classes:

1. Grand Cross, with two sub-classes:
  - with the Crown in Ore
  - with the Crown in Gold
2. Grand Commander
3. Commander
4. Knight/Dame

Gold and silver Merit Crosses were also given.

== Notable recipients ==
=== Grand Crosses ===
- Hamengkubuwana VIII
- Prince Aage, Count of Rosenborg
- Abdulaziz
- Prince Adalbert of Prussia (1811–1873)
- Prince Adalbert of Prussia (1884–1948)
- Adolf II, Prince of Schaumburg-Lippe
- Duke Adolf Friedrich of Mecklenburg
- Adolphus Frederick VI, Grand Duke of Mecklenburg-Strelitz
- Adolphus Frederick V, Grand Duke of Mecklenburg-Strelitz
- Albert, 8th Prince of Thurn and Taxis
- Prince Albert of Prussia (1809–1872)
- Prince Albert of Saxe-Altenburg
- Prince Albert of Prussia (1837–1906)
- Alexander I of Yugoslavia
- Alexander II of Russia
- Alexander III of Russia
- Alexander of Battenberg
- Prince Alexander of Hesse and by Rhine
- Prince Alexander of Prussia
- Alexander Frederick, Landgrave of Hesse
- Princess Alexandra of Hanover (born 1882)
- Alexandrine of Mecklenburg-Schwerin
- Alexis, Prince of Bentheim and Steinfurt
- Prince Alfons of Bavaria
- Alfred, Duke of Saxe-Coburg and Gotha
- Alfred, 2nd Prince of Montenuovo
- Princess Altinaï of Montenegro
- Grand Duchess Anastasia Mikhailovna of Russia
- Grand Duke Andrei Vladimirovich of Russia
- Prince Aribert of Anhalt
- Prince Arnulf of Bavaria
- Prince Arthur, Duke of Connaught and Strathearn
- Alexander Cambridge, 1st Earl of Athlone
- Prince August Wilhelm of Prussia
- Otto von Bismarck
- Borwin, Duke of Mecklenburg
- Walther Bronsart von Schellendorff
- Bernhard von Bülow
- Karl von Bülow
- Adolphus Cambridge, 1st Marquess of Cambridge
- Leo von Caprivi
- Carol I of Romania
- Charles of Solms-Hohensolms-Lich
- Prince Charles of Prussia
- Charles I of Austria
- Charles Alexander, Grand Duke of Saxe-Weimar-Eisenach
- Charles Augustus, Hereditary Grand Duke of Saxe-Weimar-Eisenach (1844–1894)
- Charles Gonthier, Prince of Schwarzburg-Sondershausen
- Charles Michael, Duke of Mecklenburg
- Chlodwig, Prince of Hohenlohe-Schillingsfürst
- Christian IX of Denmark
- Christian X of Denmark
- Duke Constantine Petrovich of Oldenburg
- Adolf von Deines
- Rudolf von Delbrück
- Eduard, Duke of Anhalt
- Edward VII
- Edward VIII
- Prince Edward of Saxe-Weimar
- Prince Eitel Friedrich of Prussia
- Emma of Waldeck and Pyrmont
- Ernest Augustus, Crown Prince of Hanover
- Ernest Louis, Grand Duke of Hesse
- Ernst I, Duke of Saxe-Altenburg
- Ernst II, Duke of Saxe-Altenburg
- Francis, Duke of Teck
- Archduke Franz Ferdinand of Austria
- Frederick Augustus III of Saxony
- Frederik VIII of Denmark
- Frederik IX of Denmark
- Frederick Francis II, Grand Duke of Mecklenburg-Schwerin
- Frederick Francis III, Grand Duke of Mecklenburg-Schwerin
- Frederick Francis IV, Grand Duke of Mecklenburg-Schwerin
- Frederick I, Duke of Anhalt
- Frederick I, Grand Duke of Baden
- Frederick II, Grand Duke of Baden
- Frederick III, German Emperor
- Prince Frederick of Hohenzollern-Sigmaringen
- Frederick William, Elector of Hesse
- Prince Frederick William of Hesse-Kassel
- Frederick William, Grand Duke of Mecklenburg-Strelitz
- Frederick William III, Landgrave of Hesse
- Friedrich II, Duke of Anhalt
- Prince Friedrich Karl of Prussia (1828–1885)
- Prince Friedrich Leopold of Prussia
- Archduke Friedrich, Duke of Teschen
- Georg, Crown Prince of Saxony
- Georg Alexander, Duke of Mecklenburg
- Duke Georg Alexander of Mecklenburg-Strelitz
- Duke Georg August of Mecklenburg-Strelitz
- George I of Greece
- George V of Hanover
- George V
- Prince George of Prussia
- Prince George, Duke of Cambridge
- Gustaf V
- Prince Gustav of Denmark
- Haakon VII of Norway
- Prince Harald of Denmark
- Prince Heinrich of Hesse and by Rhine
- Prince Henry of Battenberg
- Prince Henry of Prussia (1862–1929)
- Heinrich VII, Prince Reuss of Köstritz
- Heinrich XIV, Prince Reuss Younger Line
- Duke Henry of Mecklenburg-Schwerin
- Hermann, Prince of Hohenlohe-Langenburg
- Prince Hermann of Saxe-Weimar-Eisenach (1825–1901)
- Hermann, Prince of Solms-Hohensolms-Lich
- Paul von Hindenburg
- Dietrich von Hülsen-Haeseler
- Archduchess Ilona of Austria
- Prince Joachim of Prussia
- Prince Johann of Schleswig-Holstein-Sonderburg-Glücksburg
- Duke John Albert of Mecklenburg
- Juliana of the Netherlands
- Georg von Kameke
- Karl Theodor, Duke in Bavaria
- Prince Kitashirakawa Yoshihisa
- Knud, Hereditary Prince of Denmark
- Grand Duke Konstantin Konstantinovich of Russia
- Konstantin of Hohenlohe-Schillingsfürst
- Leopold II of Belgium
- Leopold IV, Prince of Lippe
- Prince Leopold, Duke of Albany
- Leopold, Hereditary Prince of Anhalt
- Prince Leopold of Bavaria
- Leopold, Prince of Hohenzollern
- Alexander von Linsingen
- Ewald von Lochow
- Louis IV, Grand Duke of Hesse
- Louis Ferdinand, Prince of Prussia
- Prince Ludwig Ferdinand of Bavaria
- Archduke Ludwig Viktor of Austria
- Luís I of Portugal
- Edwin Freiherr von Manteuffel
- Prince Maximilian of Baden
- Duke William of Mecklenburg-Schwerin
- Emperor Meiji
- Grand Duke Michael Alexandrovich of Russia
- Milan I of Serbia
- Prince Mirko of Montenegro
- Helmuth von Moltke the Elder
- Prince Moritz of Saxe-Altenburg
- Nicholas I of Montenegro
- Nicholas II of Russia
- Grand Duke Nicholas Nikolaevich of Russia (1831–1891)
- Grand Duke Nicholas Nikolaevich of Russia (1856–1929)
- Nicholas, Crown Prince of Montenegro
- Oscar II
- Prince Oskar of Prussia
- Pakubuwono X
- Alexander August Wilhelm von Pape
- Duke Paul Frederick of Mecklenburg (1882–1904)
- Duke Paul Frederick of Mecklenburg
- Boris Petrovitch Njegosh
- Philipp, Prince of Eulenburg
- Hans von Plessen
- Karl von Plettenberg
- Prince Friedrich Wilhelm of Prussia
- Antoni Wilhelm Radziwiłł
- Archduke Rainer Ferdinand of Austria
- Duke Robert of Württemberg
- Albrecht von Roon
- Prince Rudolf of Liechtenstein
- Rudolf, Crown Prince of Austria
- Rupprecht, Crown Prince of Bavaria
- Alfred von Schlieffen
- Gustav von Senden-Bibran
- Grand Duke Sergei Alexandrovich of Russia
- Otto Graf zu Stolberg-Wernigerode
- Ludwig Freiherr von und zu der Tann-Rathsamhausen
- Prince Valdemar of Denmark
- Julius von Verdy du Vernois
- Grand Duke Vladimir Alexandrovich of Russia
- Alfred von Waldersee
- Wilhelm II, German Emperor
- Wilhelm, German Crown Prince
- Wilhelm Karl, Duke of Urach
- Wilhelmina of the Netherlands
- William II of Württemberg
- William Ernest, Grand Duke of Saxe-Weimar-Eisenach
- Prince William of Baden (1829–1897)
- William, Prince of Hohenzollern
- Prince William of Schaumburg-Lippe
- William, Prince of Wied
- Friedrich Graf von Wrangel
- Ferdinand von Zeppelin

=== Grand Commanders ===
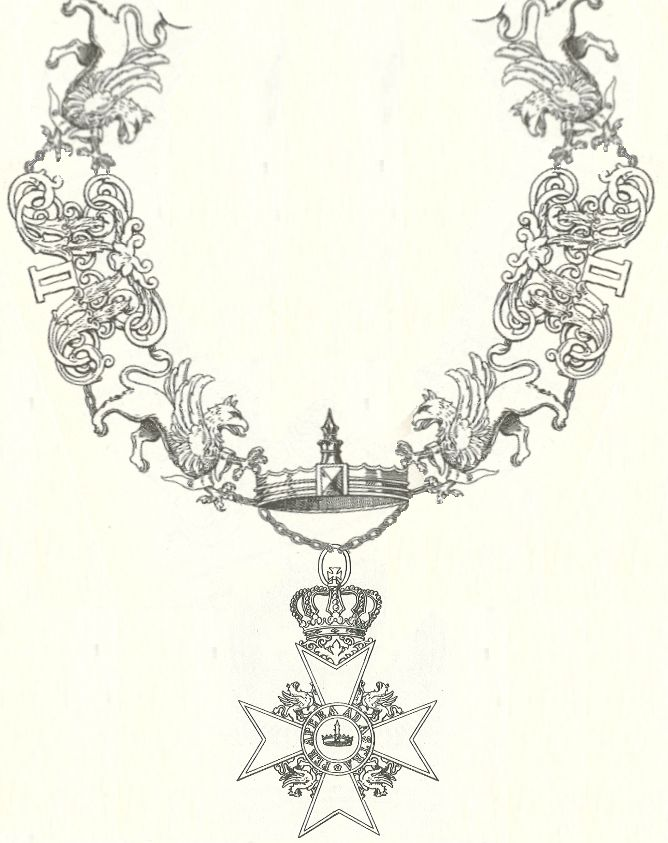
Chain of the Mecklenburg-Schwerin version of the Order

- Theodor Thierfelder

=== Commanders ===
- Friedrich Wilhelm Schirrmacher

=== Knights ===
- Hermann Rudolph Aubert
- Paul von Buri
- Gunther von Etzel
- Theodor Fontane
- Frank Linke-Crawford
- Friedrich Wigger

=== Dames ===
- Duchess Cecilie of Mecklenburg-Schwerin
- Duchess Elisabeth Alexandrine of Mecklenburg-Schwerin
- Princess Elisabeth Sybille of Saxe-Weimar-Eisenach
- Duchess Marie Antoinette of Mecklenburg
- Duchess Marie of Mecklenburg-Schwerin

=== Unknown class ===
- Alexander Barclay de Tolly-Weymarn
- Ludwig Brunow
- Joseph Hollman
- Hans von Kaltenborn-Stachau
- Julius Kühn
- Friedrich Ladegast
- Helmuth von Moltke the Younger
