= Carl Gregor Herzog zu Mecklenburg =

German art and music historian and musician (1933–2018)

- Born: 14 March 1933; Remplin, Germany
- Died: 24 July 2018 (aged 85); Hechingen, Germany
- Spouse: Princess Maria Margarethe of Hohenzollern (m. 1965, died 2006)
Names
- Carl Gregor Georg Friedrich Franz Heinrich Norbert Wenceslaus Johann Nepomuk Lazarus Clemens Maria de Mercede et omnes sancti
- House: House of Mecklenburg-Strelitz
- Father: George, Duke of Mecklenburg
- Mother: Irina Mikhailovna Raievskya

Carl Gregor Herzog zu Mecklenburg (14 March 1933 – 23 July 2018) was a German historian of music and art. He served as director of the Museum of the Roman Catholic Diocese of Rottenburg-Stuttgart for a period of 18 years, and was noted for his books on music and art. He was a member of the former Mecklenburg ducal family.

== Early life and education ==
Herzog zu Mecklenburg was born on 14 March 1933 in Remplin, Mecklenburg, in the northeast of Germany. Although he was born on the former grand ducal estate, his relative Frederick Francis IV abdicated from rule in 1918 upon the defeat of the German Empire in World War I. Thus, Herzog zu Mecklenburg ((English: Duke of Mecklenburg) serves as a surname, rather than a current title. His father was George, Duke of Mecklenburg, and his mother was Irina Mikhailovna Raievskya.

Herzog zu Mecklenburg spent his early years at Remplin Palace, until the palace was burned in 1940. His family then moved to the Berlin area until the end of the war. In 1945, the family moved to Sigmaringen and Hechingen, in southwestern Germany, where Mecklenburg remained for much of the rest of his life.

Herzog zu Mecklenburg stayed in the area for his education. He studied music at the Zimmermann Conservatory in Konstanz. He then went on to the University of Tübingen, where he completed a masters degree in art history and musicology in 1964, and a PhD in art history in 1968.

== Career ==
After completing his PhD, Herzog zu Mecklenburg worked as an assistant in the department of art history at the University of Stuttgart. He then served at the State Monument Preservation office in Tübingen. As a member of this commission, he helped campaign to save the castle and other historic buildings of Hechingen. In 1974 he was appointed the director of the Museum of the Roman Catholic Diocese of Rottenburg-Stuttgart, a position that he held until his retirement in 1992.

Herzog zu Mecklenburg is noted for his bibliographies on musical literature, particularly those on jazz.

== Personal life and death ==
Herzog zu Mecklenburg married Princess Maria Margarethe of Hohenzollern, the daughter of Franz Joseph, Prince of Hohenzollern-Emden, in a civil ceremony on 18 February 1965 in Hechingen. They had a religious ceremony on 23 April 1966 in the Chapel at Burg Hohenzollern.

Herzog zu Mecklenburg died on 24 July 2018 at the age of 85, in his home at the Villa Silberburg in Hechingen.

== Selected books ==
- Carl Gregor Herzog zu Mecklenburg (1960). Ägyptische Rhythmik: Rhythmen und Rhythmusinstrumente im heutigen Ägypten [Egyptian Rhythms: Rhythm and Rhythm Instruments in Modern Egypt]. P. H. Heitz.
- Carl Gregor Herzog zu Mecklenburg (1962). Bibliographie einiger Grenzgebiete der Musikwissenschaft [Bibliography of Fields at the Border of Musicology]. Verlag Heitz.
- Carl Gregor Herzog zu Mecklenburg (1969). International Jazz Bibliography: Jazz Books from 1919 to 1968. P. H. Heitz.
- Carl Gregor Herzog zu Mecklenburg (1971). 1970 Supplement to International Jazz Bibliography & International Drum & Percussion Bibliography. Universal Edition. ISBN 978-3-7024-0035-4.
- Carl Gregor Herzog zu Mecklenburg (1979). Erlebnis der Landschaft und adliges Landleben: Einführungen und Bibliographien zum Verständnis der Landschaft und eines deutschen Standes von 1870 bis zur Gegenwart. Propyläen. ISBN 9783549073865.

== Ancestry ==
Ancestors of Carl Gregor Herzog zu Mecklenburg

16. George, Grand Duke of Mecklenburg-Strelitz
8. Duke Georg August of Mecklenburg-Strelitz
17. Princess Marie of Hesse-Cassel
4. Duke Georg Alexander of Mecklenburg-Strelitz
18. Grand Duke Michael Pavlovich of Russia
9. Grand Duchess Catherine Mikhailovna of Russia
19. Princess Charlotte of Württemberg
2. George, Duke of Mecklenburg
20. Ardalion Alexeievich Vonljarsky
10. Feodor Ardalionovich Vanljarsky
21. Anastasia Mikhailovna Simanovskaya
5. Natalya Feodorovna Vanljarskaya
22. Feodor Feodorovich Uvarov
11. Maria Feodorovna Uvarova
23. Maria Petrovna Zhukova
1. Carl Gregor Herzog zu Mecklenburg
24. Nikolai Nikolaevich Raievsky
12. Nicholas Nikolaevich Raievsky
25. Sofya Alexandrovna Konstantinova
6. Mikhail Nikolaevich Raievsky
26. Mikhail Mikhailovich Borozdin
13. Anna Mikhailovna Borozdina
27. Yekaterina Alexandrovna Chemiakina
3. Irina Mikhailovna Raievskya
28. Prince Grigory Ivanovich Gagarin
14. Prince Grigory Grigorievich Gagarin
29. Yekaterina Petrovna Soimonova
7. Princess Maria Grigorievna Gagarina
30. Andrei Vasilievich Dashkov
15. Sofya Andreevna Dashkova
31. Anastasia Petrovna Dmitrieva-Mamonova
