= Georg Alexander, Duke of Mecklenburg =

Georg Alexander
- Duke of Mecklenburg
- Coat of arms of Georg Alexander

Head of the House of Mecklenburg-Strelitz
- Tenure: 6 July 1963 – 26 January 1996
- Predecessor: Duke George
- Successor: Duke Borwin
- Born: 27 August 1921; Nice, France
- Died: 26 January 1996 (aged 74); Mirow, Germany
- Spouse: Archduchess Ilona of Austria (m. 1946; div. 1974)
- Issue: Duchess Elisabeth Christina; Duchess Marie Katherina; Duchess Irene; Borwin, Duke of Mecklenburg
Names
- Georg Alexander Andreas Karl Michael Peter Philipp Ignaz Maria
- House: Mecklenburg-Strelitz
- Father: George, Duke of Mecklenburg
- Mother: Irina Mikhailovna Raievskya

Georg Alexander, Duke of Mecklenburg (German: Georg Alexander Herzog zu Mecklenburg; 27 August 1921 – 26 January 1996) was the head of the House of Mecklenburg-Strelitz from 1963 until his death.

== Early life ==
Georg Alexander was born in Nice, France, the eldest son of the then Count George of Carlow and his first wife Irina Mikhailovna Raievskya (1892–1955). His father assumed the title Duke of Mecklenburg with the style Serene Highness following his adoption by the head of the House of Mecklenburg-Strelitz and his uncle Duke Charles Michael. The adoption of the title was confirmed by the head of the Imperial House of Russia, Grand Duke Cyril Vladimirovich on 18 July 1929 and recognised on 23 December by Grand Duke Friedrich Franz IV of Mecklenburg-Schwerin.

With the death of Duke Charles Michael on 6 December 1934 his father succeeded as head of the Grand Ducal house of Mecklenburg-Strelitz and thus Georg Alexander became heir apparent. The grand ducal family lived at Remplin Castle in Mecklenburg until it was destroyed in a fire in April 1940. During the Second World War both Georg Alexander and his father were interned by the Gestapo for a time.

== Post World War II ==
Duke Georg Alexander studied law in Freiburg before completing his studies in banking. On 18 December 1950 his father's title was confirmed by the House of Mecklenburg-Schwerin and he then assumed the style of Highness, while his status as head of the House of Mecklenburg-Strelitz was also confirmed. At the same time the Count of Carlow title was abolished. Georg Alexander lived for a time in Ireland where he managed a number of properties. On returning to Germany he spent twenty years working for an advertising company.

On 6 July 1963 he succeeded his father as head of the Grand Ducal house of Mecklenburg-Strelitz. In 1990 he moved to Mecklenburg and was given an apartment in the former grand ducal residence of Mirow Castle by the local government and he was involved in its reconstruction. Georg Alexander died in Mirow and was succeeded as head of the Grand Ducal house by his son Duke Borwin.

== Marriage and children ==
Duke Georg Alexander was married in Sigmaringen to Archduchess Ilona of Austria (20 April 1927 – 12 January 2011) civilly on 20 February 1946 followed by a religious ceremony on 30 April. Archduchess Ilona belonged to the Hungarian Palatine branch of the House of Habsburg-Lorraine and was a granddaughter of Archduke Joseph August of Austria. Georg Alexander and Ilona had four children before divorcing on 12 December 1974.

Name	Birth	Notes
Duchess Elisabeth Christina	22 March 1947	Married Alhard, Count von dem Bussche-Ippenburg (b. 30 June 1947) civilly on 15 November 1974 in Lüdenscheid and religiously on 3 May 1975 at Hohenzollern Castle. Had two daughters and a son before divorcing on 15 December 1997.
Duchess Marie Katharina	14 November 1949	Married Wolfgang von Wasielewski (b. 15 December 1951) civilly on 17 March 1978 at Bonn and religiously on 15 July at Biengen. Has two children.
Duchess Irene	18 April 1952	Married Constantin Harmsen (b. 28 April 1954) civilly on 22 September 1979 at Mexico City and religiously at Biengen on 26 July 1980. Has two sons.
Duke Borwin	10 June 1956	Married Alice Wagner (b. 2 August 1959) in Hinterzarten civilly on 24 December 1985 and religiously on 19 July 1986. Has three children and is the current head of the House of Mecklenburg-Strelitz.

== Ancestry ==
Ancestors of Georg Alexander, Duke of Mecklenburg

8. Duke Georg August of Mecklenburg-Strelitz
4. Duke Georg Alexander of Mecklenburg-Strelitz
9. Grand Duchess Catherine Mikhailovna of Russia
2. Georg, Duke of Mecklenburg-Strelitz
10. Feodor Ardalionovich Vanljarsky
5. Natalia Feodorovna Vanljarskaya
11. Maria Feodorovna Uvarova
1. Georg Alexander, Duke of Mecklenburg-Strelitz
12. Nicholas Nikolaevich Raievsky
6. Mikhail Nikolaevich Raievsky
13. Anna Mikhailovna Borozdina
3. Irina Mikhailovna Raievskya
14. Prince Grigory Grigorievich Gagarin
7. Princess Maria Grigorievna Gagarina
15. Sophia Andreevna Dashkova

Georg Alexander, Duke of Mecklenburg House of Mecklenburg-Strelitz Cadet branch of the House of Mecklenburg Born: 27 August 1921 Died: 26 January 1996
Titles in pretence
Preceded by George	— TITULAR — Grand Duke of Mecklenburg-Strelitz; 6 July 1963 – 26 January 1996; Reason for succession failure: Grand Duchy abolished in 1918	Succeeded by Borwin
