= Natalia Feodorovna Vanljarskaya =

Russian aristocrat and Countess von Carlow (1858–1921)

Natalia Feodorovna Vonliarrskaya
- Countess von Carlow
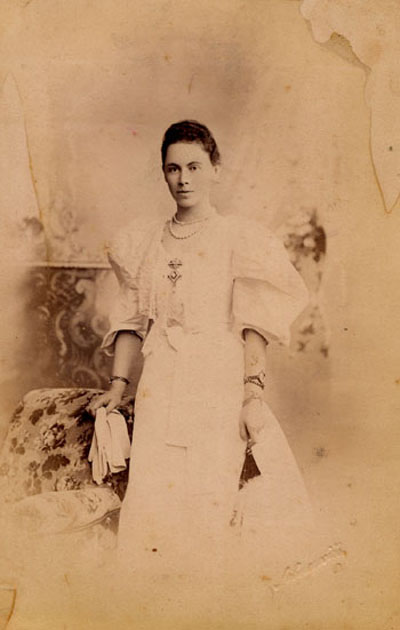
- Born: 16 May 1858; Saint Petersburg, Russian Empire
- Died: 14 March 1921 (aged 62); Cannes, France
- Spouse: Duke Georg Alexander of Mecklenburg-Strelitz (m. 1890; died 1909)
- Issue: Catherine von Carlow; Maria von Carlow; Natalia von Carlow; George, Duke of Mecklenburg
- House: House of von Carlow
- Father: Feodor Ardalionovich Vonliarliarsky
- Mother: Maria Fedorovna van der Schruhf
- Religion: Russian Orthodox
- Occupation: Lady-in-waiting

Natalia Feodorovna Vonliarskaya (16 May 1858 – 14 March 1921) was a Russian noblewoman who became the morganatic wife of Duke Georg Alexander of Mecklenburg-Strelitz.

== Court service and marriage ==
In 1884, Natalia was appointed as a lady-in-waiting to Grand Duchess Catherine Mikhailovna of Russia, a role that brought her into the intimate social circle of the Mikhailovsky Palace. It was during this early period of service, that she first encountered the Grand Duchess's son, Duke Georg Alexander of Mecklenburg-Strelitz. Their shared passion for chamber music within the palace's refined salons fostered a decade-long courtship that challenged the prevailing dynastic norms of the German and Russian empires.

The couple married on 14 February 1890 in Saint Petersburg. To provide Natalia with a rank suitable for her new status, her brother-in-law, Frederick William, Grand Duke of Mecklenburg-Strelitz, created her Countess von Carlow. The title was derived from the Carlow estate, a territory within the Mecklenburg grand duchy, effectively establishing the Carlow line as a recognized cadet branch of the House of Mecklenburg-Strelitz.

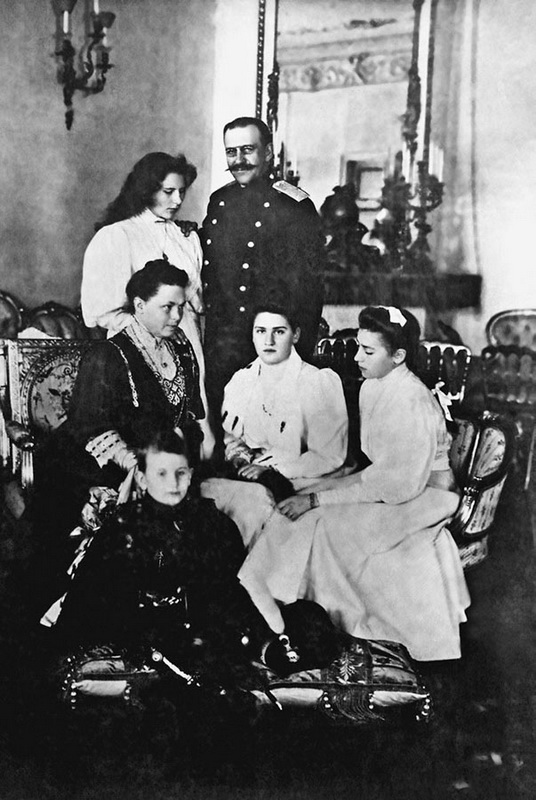
Natalia with husband and children, 1907.

== Issue ==
- Catherine von Carlow (1891–1940); married Vladimir Galitzine in 1913 and had issue.
- Maria von Carlow (1893–1979); married two times and had issue by both.
- Natalia von Carlow (1894–1913); died young.
- George, Duke of Mecklenburg (1899–1963); married firstly Irina Mikhailovna Raievskya and secondly Archduchess Charlotte of Austria.

== Bibliography ==
- Beéche, Arturo. The Grand Ducal House of Mecklenburg-Strelitz. Eurohistory, 2011. ISBN 978-0985460303.
- Rajinsky, A. The Romanovs and the Mecklenburgs. Saint Petersburg: Nauka, 1994.
- Vogel, Thomas. Die Prinzen von Sachsen-Altenburg. Altenburg: Selle, 2005. ISBN 978-3938552001.
