= George of Mecklenburg =

George of Mecklenburg German: Georg von Mecklenburg may refer to:

- Duke George Augustus of Mecklenburg (1748–1785)
- George, Grand Duke of Mecklenburg-Strelitz (1779–1860)
- Duke Georg August of Mecklenburg-Strelitz (1824–1876)
- George, Duke of Mecklenburg (1899–1963)
- Georg Alexander, Duke of Mecklenburg (1921–1996)
