= Adolphus Frederick VI =

Grand Duke of Mecklenburg-Strelitz from 1914 to 1918

- Adolphus Frederick VI in 1916

Grand Duke of Mecklenburg-Strelitz
- Reign: 11 June 1914 – 23 February 1918
- Predecessor: Adolf Frederick V
- Successor: Vacant: Charles Michael as head of house
- Born: 17 June 1882; Neustrelitz, Mecklenburg-Strelitz, Germany
- Died: 23 February 1918 (aged 35); Neustrelitz, Mecklenburg-Strelitz, Germany
Names
- Adolf Friedrich Georg Ernst Albert Eduard
- House: Mecklenburg-Strelitz
- Father: Adolphus Frederick V, Grand Duke of Mecklenburg-Strelitz
- Mother: Princess Elisabeth of Anhalt
- Religion: Lutheran

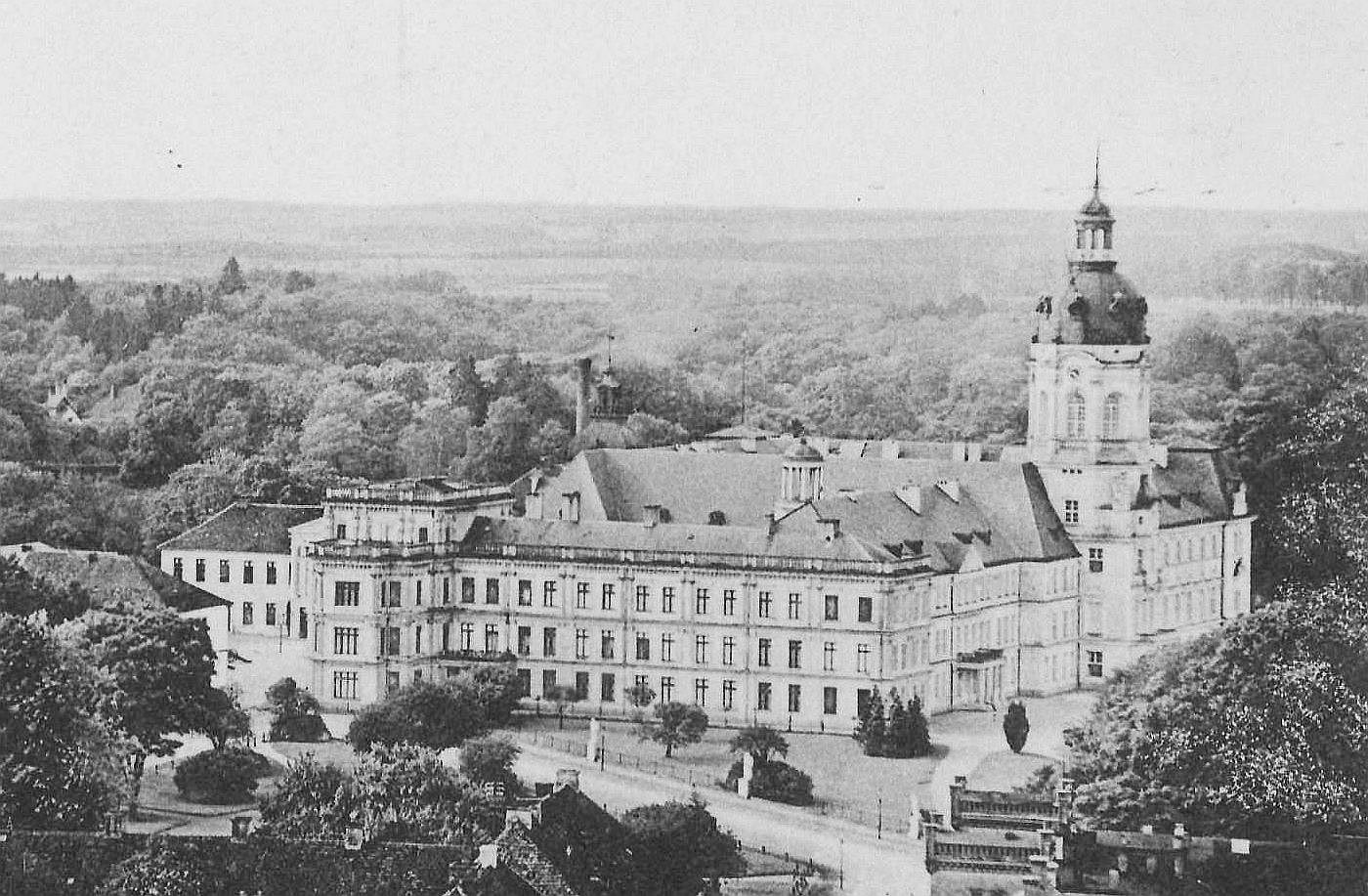
Neustrelitz Palace (ca. 1900)

Adolphus Frederick VI (German: Adolf Friedrich VI; 17 June 1882 – 23 February 1918) was the last reigning Grand Duke of Mecklenburg-Strelitz.

== Early life ==
Adolphus Frederick George Ernest Albert Edward of Mecklenburg was born in Neustrelitz, the third child and eldest son of Adolphus Frederick V, Grand Duke of Mecklenburg-Strelitz, and his wife, Princess Elisabeth of Anhalt. He attended a gymnasium school in Dresden and later studied jurisprudence in Munich and served in the Prussian army. Adolphus Frederick became heir apparent to the Grand Duchy, with the title of Hereditary Grand Duke of Mecklenburg-Strelitz, following the death of his grandfather Grand Duke Frederick William on 30 May 1904.

Adolphus Frederick and his younger brother Duke Karl Borwin are said to have agreed that Adolphus Frederick could devote his life to painting, while Karl Borwin would marry and continue the dynasty; but this agreement could never be realised, as Karl Borwin was killed during a duel with Count George Jametel in 1908. Adolphus Frederick was subsequently reported to be engaged to various European princesses, including Princess Viktoria Luise of Prussia, the only daughter of the German Emperor William II and his consort, Augusta Victoria of Schleswig-Holstein.

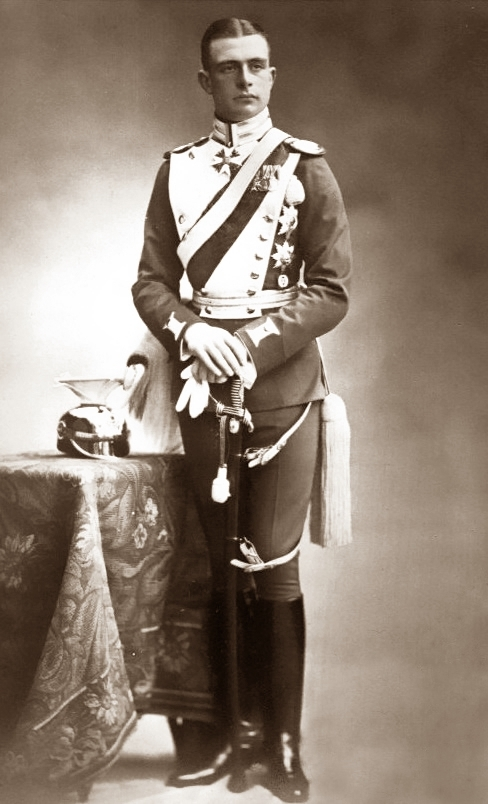
Adolf Frederick in 1909

He succeeded as Grand Duke on the death of his father on 11 June 1914, just a few weeks before the outbreak of World War I. Adolphus Frederick was reported to have married morganatically with attempts made to force him to divorce his wife and conduct an equal marriage, but he was reported to have refused. Recent research has disproven claims that he was the father of the children of operatic soprano Mafalda Salvatini. An Italian by birth but raised mainly in Paris, and a star at the Berlin State Opera and the Deutsche Oper Berlin, Salvatini had been his mistress from 1908 until his suicide in 1918. Her two sons, Charles E. (Horst) Gérard and the theatre production designer and painter Rolf Gérard, were shown not to be illegitimate children of the Grand Duke, though this had been suspected.

== Succession crisis and a possible marriage ==
With Adolf Friedrich having come to the throne while unmarried and without a male heir there was an issue surrounding the succession as his cousin and heir, Russian based Duke Charles Michael of Mecklenburg-Strelitz had indicated just before First World War broke out that he wished to renounce his succession rights. If there was no male heir to Mecklenburg-Strelitz the grand duchy would merge with the neighboring Grand Duchy of Mecklenburg-Schwerin.

During the war the topic of marriage was discussed by Adolf Friedrich and his friend Daisy, Princess of Pless, however in wartime it was very difficult to arrange a meeting with an eligible princess. Eventually, Daisy identified her husband's relative, Princess Benigna Karoline Elisabeth Charlotte Reuss of Köstritz as a suitable bride. She was the third child and the only daughter of Prince Heinrich XXVIII Reuss of Köstritz and his first wife, Countess Magdalene of Solms-Laubach.

As Adolf Friedrich was agreeable to the match his Minister-President Heinrich Bossart started negotiations with the future bride's family to bring about the marriage. However, before the engagement could be announced there was the complication of a connection to a woman whom Adolf Friedrich needed to be freed from. Rumor has it that the woman in question was Margrit Höllrigl, Countess Bubna of Litic with whom he had a relationship while he was based in Potsdam. Because of this, the previously arranged marriage to Princess Benigna never materialized and after that she never married.

== Death ==
On 23 February 1918 at Neustrelitz, Adolphus Frederick committed suicide. This left Mecklenburg-Strelitz facing a succession crisis, as the only surviving member of the Strelitz line, Duke Charles Michael of Mecklenburg, had served in the Russian military (in opposition to German and allied forces) and had indicated in 1914 that he wished to renounce his rights to the throne of Mecklenburg-Strelitz; at Adolphus Frederick's request, Charles Michael later agreed to defer any renunciation until the matter arose. There was also a morganatic male-line relative, Duke Charles Michael's nephew George, Count of Carlow.

Because Charles Michael was in Russia, Grand Duke Friedrich Franz IV of Mecklenburg-Schwerin became regent for Mecklenburg-Strelitz and remained such until the end of the German monarchies in 1918, when the government in Strelitz declared the end of the regency. Friedrich Franz IV received confirmation from Charles Michael that he wished to renounce his succession rights, although this only arrived in 1919, after the abolition of the monarchies and the establishment of the Free State of Mecklenburg-Strelitz.

Adolphus's fortune had been amassed by his grandfather and was estimated at 30 million marks (€54 million in 2021). In his will, he left his entire fortune to Friedrich Franz IV of Mecklenburg-Schwerin's second son, Duke Christian Ludwig (1912–1996). He did this on the condition that Christian agree to become Grand Duke of Mecklenburg-Strelitz and take up residence in Neustrelitz; otherwise the inheritance would be reduced to 3 million marks.

== Titles, styles and honours ==
=== Titles and styles ===
- 17 June 1882 – 30 May 1904: His Highness Duke Adolphus Frederick of Mecklenburg-Strelitz
- 30 May 1904 – 11 June 1914: His Royal Highness The Hereditary Grand Duke of Mecklenburg-Strelitz
- 11 June 1914 – 23 February 1918: His Royal Highness The Grand Duke of Mecklenburg-Strelitz

=== Honours ===
He received the following awards:

- Mecklenburg:
  - Grand Cross of the Wendish Crown, with Crown in Ore, 30 July 1898; Joint Grand Master with Collar, 11 June 1914
  - Knight of the Griffon, 14 March 1905; Joint Grand Master and Grand Cross, 11 June 1914
  - Cross for Distinction in War (Strelitz), 2nd and 1st Classes
  - Military Merit Cross (Schwerin), 2nd Class
  - Memorial Medal for Grand Duke Adolf Friedrich V (Strelitz)
- Principality of Montenegro:
  - Grand Cross of the Order of Prince Danilo I, 28 July 1899
  - Knight of St. Peter of Cetinje
- Duchy of Anhalt:
  - Grand Cross of the Order of Albert the Bear, 1899
  - Order of Merit for Science and Art, 1st Class
- United Kingdom:
  - King Edward VII Coronation Medal, 1902
  - King George V Coronation Medal, 1911
  - Honorary Grand Cross of the Royal Victorian Order, 22 June 1911
- Kingdom of Bavaria: Knight of St. Hubert, 1903
- (Saxe-Coburg and Gotha) (Duchy of Saxe-Altenburg) (Saxe-Meiningen) Ernestine duchies: Grand Cross of the Saxe-Ernestine House Order
- Kingdom of Prussia:
  - Knight of the Black Eagle, with Collar 28.12.1909
  - Grand Cross of the Red Eagle
  - Iron Cross (1914), 2nd and 1st Classes
- (Hohenzollern-Sigmaringen) Hohenzollern: Cross of Honour of the Princely House Order of Hohenzollern, 1st Class with Swords
- Schaumburg-Lippe: Cross of Honour of the House Order of Lippe, 1st Class

== Ancestors ==
Ancestors of Adolphus Frederick VI

8. George, Grand Duke of Mecklenburg-Strelitz
4. Frederick William, Grand Duke of Mecklenburg-Strelitz
9. Princess Marie of Hesse-Kassel
2. Adolphus Frederick V, Grand Duke of Mecklenburg-Strelitz
10. Prince Adolphus, Duke of Cambridge
5. Princess Augusta of Cambridge
11. Princess Augusta of Hesse-Kassel
1. Adolphus Frederick VI, Grand Duke of Mecklenburg-Strelitz
12. Leopold IV, Duke of Anhalt
6. Frederick I, Duke of Anhalt
13. Princess Frederica of Prussia
3. Princess Elisabeth of Anhalt
14. Prince Eduard of Saxe-Altenburg
7. Princess Antoinette of Saxe-Altenburg
15. Princess Amalie of Hohenzollern-Sigmaringen

Adolphus Frederick VI House of Mecklenburg-Strelitz Cadet branch of the House of Mecklenburg Born: 17 June 1882 Died: 23 February 1918
Regnal titles
Preceded by Adolf Friedrich V	Grand Duke of Mecklenburg-Strelitz; 1914–1918	Vacant Regency of Friedrich Franz IV
