= Borwin, Duke of Mecklenburg =

Head of the House of Mecklenburg

Borwin
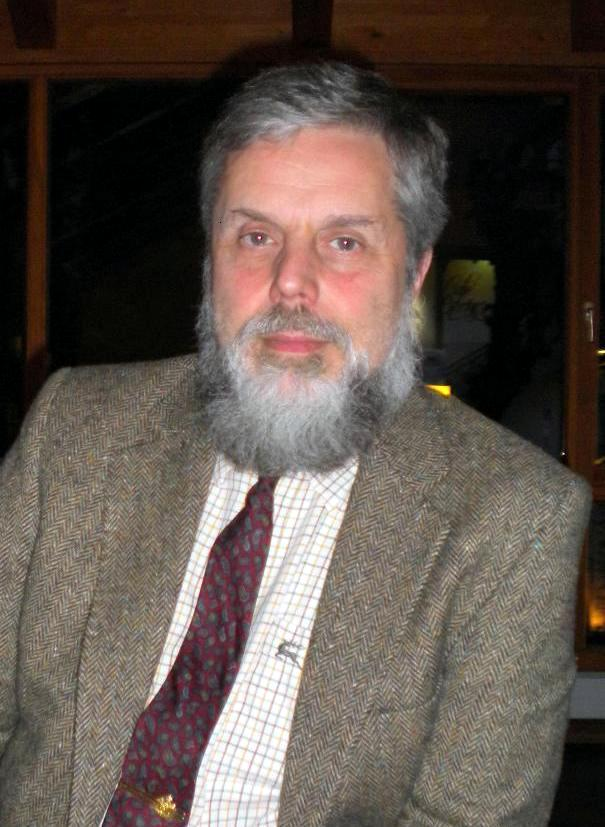
- Duke Borwin in Titisee Village in November 2010

Head of the House of Mecklenburg-Strelitz
- Tenure: 26 January 1996 – present
- Predecessor: Duke Georg Alexander

Head of the House of Mecklenburg
- Tenure: 31 July 2001 – present
- Heir apparent: Duke Alexander
- Born: 10 June 1956 (age 70); Freiburg im Breisgau, Baden-Württemberg, West Germany
- Spouse: Alice Marianne Wagner (m. 1985)
- Issue: 3
Names
- Georg Borwin Friedrich Franz Karl Stephan Konrad Hubertus Maria
- House: Mecklenburg-Strelitz
- Father: Georg Alexander, Duke of Mecklenburg
- Mother: Archduchess Ilona of Austria

Borwin, Duke of Mecklenburg (German: Borwin Herzog zu Mecklenburg; given names: Georg Borwin Friedrich Franz Karl Stephan Konrad Hubertus Maria; born 10 June 1956), has been the head of the House of Mecklenburg-Strelitz since 1996 and of the entire House of Mecklenburg since 2001. The death of Friedrich Franz, Hereditary Grand Duke of Mecklenburg-Schwerin – his godfather – the last male member of the House of Mecklenburg-Schwerin on 31 July 2001 made Strelitz the only remaining line of the House of Mecklenburg, which ruled in Mecklenburg until 1918.

Borwin, his sons Alexander and Michael, and his grandson Leopold, are the only known surviving legitimate male-line descendants of the medieval princely dynasty descended from Niklot of the Obotrites, which has included Albert, King of Sweden.

== Education and career ==
Duke Borwin of Mecklenburg was born in Freiburg im Breisgau the youngest child and only son of Duke Georg Alexander of Mecklenburg and his wife Archduchess Ilona of Austria (1927–2011) the daughter of Archduke Joseph Francis of Austria and Princess Anna of Saxony. He is an agnatic descendant of Grand Duke Georg of Mecklenburg-Strelitz and through his mother a descendant of King Frederick Augustus III of Saxony and Emperor Franz Joseph I of Austria.

Duke Borwin became the heir apparent to headship of the House of Mecklenburg-Strelitz on 6 July 1963 when his grandfather died and his father succeeded as head of the house. Borwin has studied viticulture at the Geisenheim Grape Breeding Institute and served as an officer in the German Army. He has also managed a Swiss drinks company.

In politics, Duke Borwin is a former local party chairman for the Christian Democratic Union in the village of Hinterzarten in the Breisgau-Hochschwarzwald district of Baden-Württemberg, leaving his post in May 2009.

== Head of the house ==
In 1928 his grandfather George was adopted by his uncle and the head of the House of Mecklenburg-Strelitz, Duke Charles Michael. His grandfather subsequently assumed the title of Duke of Mecklenburg with the style Serene Highness which was confirmed on 18 July 1929 by the head of the Imperial House of Russia, Grand Duke Cyril Vladimirovich and then recognised on 23 December by the former Grand Duke Frederick Francis IV of Mecklenburg-Schwerin. On 18 December 1950, Hereditary Grand Duke Friedrich Franz of Mecklenburg-Schwerin confirmed the ducal title and also granted the style Highness, which in conjunction with the title, is the style enjoyed by dynastic members of the House of Mecklenburg. His grandfather was also confirmed as head of the house.

Duke Borwin succeeded as head of the House of Mecklenburg-Strelitz following his father's death on 26 January 1996. With the death of Hereditary Grand Duke Friedrich Franz on the 31 July 2001, the House of Mecklenburg-Schwerin has become extinct in the male line leaving Mecklenburg-Strelitz as the only surviving branch of the grand ducal house.

Duke Borwin is the patron and protector of the Order of the Griffon which was revived in September 1984. The order was founded by Grand Duke Frederick Francis III of Mecklenburg-Schwerin on 15 September 1884. He has also served on the Almanach de Gotha's Comité de Patronage.

In 2005 Duke Borwin along with the head of the House of Hohenzollern, Georg Friedrich, Prince of Prussia attended the seasonal opening of Hohenzieritz Castle in Mecklenburg-Vorpommern. It was the castle where Louise of Mecklenburg-Strelitz, who married Frederick William III of Prussia and became Queen of Prussia, died in 1810.

== Marriage and children ==
Duke Borwin married Alice Marianne Wagner (born 2 August 1959 in Hinterzarten, Baden-Württemberg, West Germany), daughter of Dr. Jürgen-Detlev Wagner (28 January 1918, Lübeck, 18 August 1918 - ?) and wife Marianne Biehl (3 February 1930 – Hinterzarten, 26 April 2008) in a civil marriage on 24 December 1985 in Hinterzarten followed by a religious ceremony on 19 July 1986 also in Hinterzarten. They have three children.

== Honours ==
Styles of Borwin, Duke of Mecklenburg
- Reference style: His Highness
- Spoken style: Your Highness

=== National dynastic honours ===
- House of Mecklenburg: Sovereign Knight Grand Cross with Collar of the House Order of the Wendish Crown

=== Foreign dynastic honours ===
- Montenegrin Royal Family: Knight of the Royal Order of Saint Peter of Cetinje
- Montenegrin Royal Family: Knight Grand Cross of the Royal Order of Prince Danilo I, Special Class

== Ranks ==
- United States: Member of the Sons of the American Revolution

Borwin, Duke of Mecklenburg House of Mecklenburg-Strelitz Cadet branch of the House of Mecklenburg Born: 10 June 1956
Titles in pretence
| Preceded by Georg Alexander | — TITULAR — Grand Duke of Mecklenburg-Strelitz; 26 January 1996–Present; Reason for succession failure: Grand Duchy abolished in 1918 | Incumbent; Heir: Duke Alexander of Mecklenburg |
| Preceded by Friedrich Franz (V) | — TITULAR — Grand Duke of Mecklenburg-Schwerin; 31 July 2001–Present; Reason for succession failure: Grand Duchy abolished in 1918 | Incumbent; Heir: Duke Alexander of Mecklenburg |
