= Archduchess Ilona of Austria =

Archduchess Ilona
- Duchess of Mecklenburg
- Born: 20 April 1927; Budapest, Kingdom of Hungary
- Died: 12 January 2011 (aged 83); Freiburg, Baden-Württemberg, Germany
- Spouse: Georg Alexander, Duke of Mecklenburg (m. 1946; div. 1974)
- Issue: Duchess Elisabeth Christine; Duchess Marie Catherine; Duchess Irene; Duke Borwin
Names
- German: Helene; Hungarian: Ilona
- House: Habsburg-Lorraine
- Father: Archduke Joseph Francis of Austria
- Mother: Princess Anna Monika of Saxony

Coat of Arms of Archduchess Ilona of Austria

Archduchess Ilona of Austria (German: Ilona Erzherzogin von Österreich; 20 April 1927 – 12 January 2011) was a member of the Hungarian Palatine branch of the House of Habsburg-Lorraine. She was married and later divorced from the late head of the House of Mecklenburg-Strelitz, Georg Alexander, Duke of Mecklenburg.

== Family and marriage ==
Archduchess Ilona (Helene) of Austria was born in Budapest, Hungary, the second daughter and child of Archduke Joseph Francis of Austria and his wife Princess Anna of Saxony. Her father was the son of Archduke Joseph August of Austria who was one of the heads of the provisional government of Hungary following the removal of King Charles IV. Her mother was a daughter of the last king of Saxony, Frederick Augustus III.

Ilona married Duke Georg Alexander of Mecklenburg civilly on 20 February 1946 and religiously on 30 April 1946 in Sigmaringen, Württemberg-Hohenzollern during the allied occupation of Germany. Her husband was the eldest child and heir of George, Duke of Mecklenburg, head of the House of Mecklenburg-Strelitz and his first wife Irina Mikhailovna Raievskya.

On 6 July 1963, following the death of her father in law her husband became the new head of the House of Mecklenburg-Strelitz. Ilona and Georg Alexander had three daughters and a son before divorcing on 12 December 1974.

Ilona died in the morning of 12 January 2011 in Freiburg, Baden-Württemberg, Germany, aged 83.

== Children ==
Name	Birth	Notes
Duchess Elisabeth Christine	22 March 1947	Married Alhard, Baron von dem Bussche-Ippenburg (born 30 June 1947) civilly on 15 November 1974 in Lüdenscheid and religiously on 3 May 1975 at Hohenzollern Castle. Had two daughters and one son, Ricarda, Josina and Gabriel before divorcing on 15 December 1997.
Duchess Marie Catherine	14 November 1949	Married Wolfgang von Wasielewski (born 15 December 1951) civilly on 17 March 1978 at Bonn and religiously on 15 July at Biengen. Has two children, Natalia and Alexander.
Duchess Irene	18 April 1952	Married Constantin Harmsen (born 28 April 1954) civilly on 22 September 1979 at Mexico City and religiously at Biengen on 26 July 1980. Has two sons, Maximilian and Moritz.
Duke Borwin	10 June 1956	Married Alice Wagner (born 2 August 1959) in Hinterzarten civilly on 24 December 1985 and religiously on 19 July 1986. Has three children, Olga, Alexander and Michael, and is the current head of the House of Mecklenburg-Strelitz.

== Ancestry ==
Ancestors of Archduchess Ilona of Austria

8. Archduke Joseph Karl, Palatine of Hungary
4. Archduke Joseph August, Palatine of Hungary
9. Princess Clotilde of Saxe-Coburg and Gotha
2. Archduke Joseph Francis of Austria
10. Prince Leopold of Bavaria
5. Princess Auguste of Bavaria
11. Archduchess Gisela of Austria
1. Archduchess Ilona of Austria
12. George of Saxony
6. Frederick Augustus III of Saxony
13. Infanta Maria Ana of Portugal
3. Princess Anna of Saxony
14. Ferdinand IV, Grand Duke of Tuscany
7. Archduchess Louise of Austria
15. Princess Alice of Bourbon-Parma

Archduchess Ilona of Austria House of Habsburg-Lorraine Cadet branch of the House of Lorraine Born: 20 April 1927 Died: 12 January 2011
Titles in pretence
Preceded by Archduchess Charlotte of Austria	— TITULAR — Grand Duchess consort of Mecklenburg-Strelitz; 6 July 1963 – 12 December 1974; Reason for succession failure: Grand Duchy abolished in 1918	Vacant Title next held by Alice Wagner
