= Irina Mikhailovna Raievskya =

Russian and German noble

- Duchess of Mecklenburg
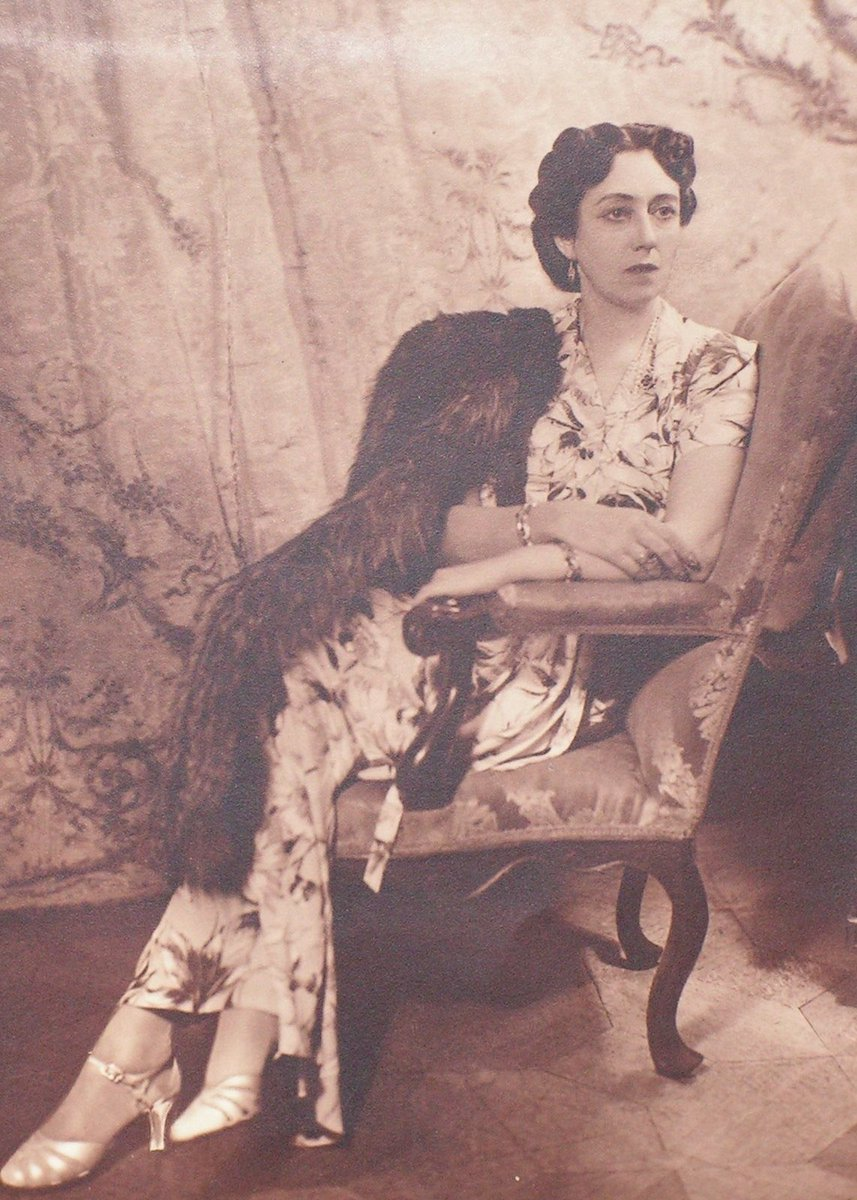
- Born: 18 August 1892; Tsarskoye Selo, Saint Petersburg, Russian Empire
- Died: 22 January 1955 (aged 62); Sigmaringen, Baden-Württemberg, West Germany
- Buried: Einsiedlerkapelle, Inzigkofen
- Noble family: Rayevski (by birth); Tolstoy (by marriage); Mecklenburg-Strelitz (by marriage)
- Spouses: Count Alexander Mikhailovich Tolstoy (m. 1915; died 1918) George, Duke of Mecklenburg (m. 1920)
- Issue: Countess Irina Aleksandrovna Tolstaya; Count Mikhaïl Alexandrovitch Tolstoy; Georg Alexander, Duke of Mecklenburg; Count Alexander of Carlow; Duchess Helene of Mecklenburg; Duke Carl Gregor of Mecklenburg
- Parents: Mikhail Nikolaievich Rayevsky; Princess Mariya Grigoryevna Gagarina

Irina Mikhailovna Raievskya (Russian: Ирина Михайловна Раевская; 18 August 1892 – 22 January 1955), was a Russian and German noble. She was Duchess of Mecklenburg by her marriage to her second husband, George, Duke of Mecklenburg (German: Georg Herzog zu Mecklenburg), who was the head of the House of Mecklenburg-Strelitz from 1934 until his death in 1963. Irina was the great-grandmother of Sophie, Princess of Prussia, wife of Georg Friedrich, Prince of Prussia, current head of the House of Hohenzollern.

== Early life ==
Irina Mikhailovna Rayevskaya was born on 18 August 1892 in Tsarskoye Selo, the residence of the Russian Imperial family, into the prominent Rayevski aristocratic house. Her father, Mikhail Nikolaievich Rayevsky (1841–1893), was a high-ranking military officer and the President of the Russian Imperial Society of Horticulture. Through her mother, Princess Mariya Grigoryevna Gagarina (1851–1941), Irina was a granddaughter of the renowned diplomat and artist Prince Grigory Grigorievich Gagarin.

As a descendant of the Rayevski line, Irina was an heiress to the legacy of Grigori Potemkin, Prince of Tauria, through his sister Maria Alexandrovna Potemkina. Her upbringing within the highest ranks of the Russian nobility in Saint Petersburg was characterized by the traditional education of the period, encompassing languages and court etiquette, before the family's life was altered by the Russian Revolution.

== Marriages and children ==
Irina Mikhailovna Raievskya was married firstly in Saint Petersburg, Russian Empire, on 5 November 1915 to Count Alexander Mikhailovich Tolstoy (1888–1918), son of Count Michael Tolstoy (1845–1913) and his wife Princess Olga Alexandrovna Vassiltchikov. The children of her first marriage were:

- Countess Irina Aleksandrovna Tolstaya (1917–1998); married Franz Ferdinand, Prince of Isenburg (1901–1956).They were the grandparents of Princess Sophie (born 1978, wife of Prince Georg Friedrich of Prussia current Head of House of Hohenzollern) and Archduchess Katharina (born 1971, wife of Archduke Martin of Austria Este)
- Count Mikhaïl Alexandrovitch Tolstoy (1918–2004); married Francine Paule Yvonne Bregentzer (1923–2009)

After Irina was widowed on 2 October 1918, she was married secondly in Geneva, Switzerland, on 7 October 1920 to George, Duke of Mecklenburg (1899–1963), son of Duke Georg Alexander of Mecklenburg-Strelitz (1859–1909) and his wife, Natalia Feodorovna Vanljarskaya, Countess of Carlow (1858–1921). The children of her second marriage were:

- Georg Alexander, Duke of Mecklenburg (1921–1996); married Archduchess Ilona of Austria (1927–2011)
- Count Alexander of Carlow (born and died in 1922)
- Duchess Helene of Mecklenburg (1924–1962); married Hassan Sayed Kamil, an Egyptian-Swiss arms dealer (1918–1991). She was killed in a plane crash.
- Duke Carl Gregor of Mecklenburg (1933–2018); married Princess Maria Margarethe of Hohenzollern (1928–2006), daughter of Franz Joseph, Prince of Hohenzollern-Emden.

== Later life ==
She fled with her family after the October Revolution from the Russian Empire first to France, then to Denmark, and last to Germany. With her second husband, George, Duke of Mecklenburg, from 1923 she lived in Schloss Remplin, Germany until it burned down in the Second World War on 10 April 1940. Subsequently, the family moved to Grunewald, Berlin. After their house in Grunewald was destroyed by bombing in February 1944, they moved by invitation of Margarete of Hohenzollern in March 1944 to Sigmaringen. Her second husband, George, Duke of Mecklenburg, was held prisoner by the Nazi government from 1944 until he was released in February 1945.

Irina and her second husband were interested in art and music.

Irina was a lady-in-waiting to Empress Alexandra of Russia until she got married in 1915 (Note: She joined as a lady-in-waiting on August 26, 1912.).

She died on 22 January 1955 in Sigmaringen, and was buried in the Einsiedlerkapelle, Inzigkofen, Germany.

Her second husband converted to Catholicism in 1920. After he was widowed on 22 January 1955, he married his second wife, Archduchess Charlotte of Austria (1921–1989), on 21 July 1956 in Pöcking. She was the daughter of Emperor Charles I of Austria (1887–1922) and his wife, Empress Zita of Bourbon-Parma (1892–1989). George died in Sigmaringen of a heart attack. He was succeeded as head of the Grand Ducal House by his eldest son, Duke Georg Alexander.

== Duchess of Mecklenburg ==
On 6 December 1934, Charles Michael, Duke of Mecklenburg, uncle of her husband George died, and George succeeded him as head of the House of Mecklenburg-Strelitz.

On 18 December 1950 the House of Mecklenburg-Schwerin confirmed the decisions made in 1929 regarding George's title, and he assumed the style of Highness while his status as head of the House of Mecklenburg-Strelitz was also confirmed. At the same time, the Count of Carlow title was abolished.

== Ancestry ==
Ancestors of Irina Mikhailovna Raievskya

8. Nikolai Nikolaevich Raievsky
4. Nicholas Nikolaevich Raievsky
9. Sofya Alexandrovna Konstantinova
2. Mikhail Nikolaevich Raievsky
10. Mikhail Mikhailovich Borozdin
5. Anna Mikhailovna Borozdina
11. Yekaterina Alexandrovna Chemiakina
1. Irina Mikhailovna Raievskya
12. Prince Grigory Ivanovich Gagarin
6. Prince Grigory Grigorievich Gagarin
13. Yekaterina Petrovna Soimonova
3. Princess Maria Grigorievna Gagarina
14. Andrei Vasilievich Dashkov
7. Sofya Andreevna Dashkova
15. Anastasia Petrovna Dmitrieva-Mamonova

== Notes ==
Irina Mikhailovna Raievskya House of Raievsky Born: 18 August 1892 Died: 22 January 1955
Titles in pretence
Vacant Title last held by Princess Elisabeth of Anhalt	— TITULAR — Grand Duchess consort of Mecklenburg-Strelitz; 6 December 1934 – 22 January 1955; Reason for succession failure: Grand Duchy abolished in 1918	Succeeded by Archduchess Charlotte of Austria
