= Archduchess Charlotte of Austria =

Archduchess Charlotte
- Duchess of Mecklenburg-Strelitz
- Born: 1 March 1921; Prangins, Switzerland
- Died: 23 July 1989 (aged 68); Munich, West Germany
- Spouse: George, Duke of Mecklenburg-Strelitz (m. 1956; died 1963)
Names
- Charlotte Hedwig Franziska Josepha Maria Antonia Roberta Ottonia Pia Anna Ignatia Marcus d'Aviano Habsburg-Lothringen
- House: Habsburg-Lorraine
- Father: Charles I of Austria
- Mother: Princess Zita of Bourbon-Parma

Archduchess Charlotte of Austria (German: Erzherzogin Charlotte von Österreich; 1 March 1921 – 23 July 1989) was a daughter of Emperor Charles I of Austria and his wife Princess Zita of Bourbon-Parma. She was also known by the name Charlotte de Bar while a welfare worker in the United States from 1943 to 1956.

== Life ==
Charlotte Hedwig Franziska Josepha Maria Antonia Roberta Ottonia Pia Anna Ignatia Marcus d'Aviano of Habsburg-Lorraine was born in Prangins, Switzerland, where the Austrian imperial family was living in exile following the collapse of the Austro-Hungarian Empire after the First World War. Her family lived in various countries during their exile: after they left Switzerland they went to the Portuguese island of Madeira where her father died a month after her first birthday, having contracted pneumonia. Her sister, Elisabeth was born one month later. They later settled in Belgium before leaving Europe to flee to the United States to escape the Nazis. Having moved to Canada with her family, she obtained a degree in economics from Laval University in 1942 and pursued further education at Fordham University upon returning to the United States.

In 1943 Archduchess Charlotte started work as a welfare worker in Manhattan's East Harlem neighbourhood using the name Charlotte de Bar.

In May 1956, Charlotte became engaged to George, Duke of Mecklenburg and head of the House of Mecklenburg-Strelitz. They were married in a civil ceremony on 21 July 1956 in Pöcking, Germany, followed by a religious ceremony four days later. She left her position as a welfare worker after her marriage. Her husband Duke George died on 6 July 1963 and they had no children.

Archduchess Charlotte died in Munich four months after the death of her mother.

== Ancestry ==
Ancestors of Archduchess Charlotte of Austria

8. Archduke Karl Ludwig of Austria
4. Archduke Otto Franz of Austria
9. Princess Maria Annunziata of Bourbon-Two Sicilies
2. Charles I of Austria
10. George of Saxony
5. Princess Maria Josepha of Saxony
11. Infanta Maria Ana of Portugal
1. Archduchess Charlotte of Austria
12. Charles III, Duke of Parma
6. Robert I, Duke of Parma
13. Princess Louise of Artois
3. Princess Zita of Bourbon-Parma
14. Miguel I of Portugal
7. Infanta Maria Antónia of Portugal
15. Princess Adelaide of Löwenstein

Archduchess Charlotte of Austria House of Habsburg Born: 1 March 1921 Died: 23 July 1989
Titles in pretence
Vacant Title last held by Irina Mikhailovna Raievskya	— TITULAR — Grand Duchess Consort of Mecklenburg-Strelitz; 21 July 1956 – 6 July 1963; Reason for succession failure: Grand Duchy abolished in 1918	Succeeded by Archduchess Ilona of Austria
