= Friedrich Wigger =

- Born: June 17, 1825; Dassow, Mecklenburg-Schwerin, Germany
- Died: September 24, 1886 (aged 61); Schwerin, Mecklenburg-Schwerin, Germany
- Education: Göttingen; Berlin
- Occupations: Philologist; Historian; Teacher; Archivist; Genealogist
- Parent(s): Joachim Friederich Heinerich Wigger; Elisabeth Louise Catharina Kniep

Friedrich Wigger (17 June 1825 - 24 September 1886) was a north German archivist. During the second half of the nineteenth century he served as archivist in charge of the "Großherzogliche Geheime und Hauptarchiv Schwerin in Mecklenburg", the precursor to the Central State Archive of Mecklenburg-Vorpommern. Wigger was also a local historian and genealogist, noted in particular for his "Stammtafeln des Großherzoglichen Hauses von Meklenburg" ("Genealogies of the Grand Ducal House of Mecklenburg").

== Life ==
Peter Gottlieb Daniel Friedrich Wigger was born in Dassow, a small coastal town which served as the collection point for agricultural and other produce from the surrounding region prior to transfer, in necessarily flat bottomed barges, to the great port city of Lübeck. Joachim Friederich Heinerich Wigger, his father, is described (using a regional word) as a trader/shopkeeper ("Kramer"). Friedrich Wigger attended the ancient Cathedral School at the nearby peninsular municipality of Ratzeburg. In 1844 he enrolled at the University of Göttingen where he studied Philology and History. later transferring to the Friedrich Wilhelm University (as "the Humboldt" was known at that time) in Berlin. He was still in Göttingen when, in 1845, he joined the "Progreß-Burschenschaft Hercynia Göttingen" [student fraternity], taking "Harold" as his "pub pseudonym". In 1848 he successfully sat for the "Ordine pro Facultas Docendi", broadly comparable with the modern level-1 national teaching exam. While studying at Berlin, Wigger became familiar with the pioneering methodology of the Philologist and literary critic Karl Lachmann. Lachmann became an enduring influence in respect of his own approach to Philological and Historical research even though, in later years, he came to be known for supporting contested traditions - at least to the extent that individual sets of circumstances permitted - rather than simply attacking them.

After completing his studies Friedrich Wigger took a succession of posts as a private tutor until 1855, when he accepted a permanent teaching position at the prestigious (Note: The claim is made that the "Fürstenschule Fridericianum Schwerin", founded in 1553, is one of the oldest schools in the German-speaking world.) Fridericianum (secondary school) in Schwerin. 1859 saw the publication of his "Hochdeutsche Grammatik mit Rücksicht auf die plattdeutsche Mundart" (loosely, "High German Grammar with regard to Low German dialect"), tailored expressly to meet the needs of schools in Mecklenburg. One commentator found it "compact but effective". It may have been at least in part a reflection of the success of this little volume that in 1860 he was promoted to the rank of "senior teacher" ("Oberlehrer").

Friedrich Wigger already had a longstanding interest in the archives of the Grand Duchy of Mecklenburg-Schwerin. On 28 January 1861 he accepted a position in charge of the "Academic Commission for Producing a Mecklenburg Book of Records" ("Wissenschaftliche Commission für die Herausgabe eines Mecklenburgischen Urkundenbuches"). He was confirmed in the post by the Grand Duke himself. Faced with a major task of compiling, documenting and editing, Wigger was obliged to resign his job with the schools service, which he did with effect from 23 December 1861. He received the positions of "Registrar if the Grand Ducal Main Privy Archive" and "Second Librarian of the Government Library". Already in 1860, in time for the twenty-fifth anniversary celebrations of the "Mecklenburg History and Antiquities Association", he had managed to publish the "Annals for Mecklenburg up till 1066". This was a chronologically sequenced collection of sources for Mecklenburg and west Slavic history from earliest recorded times, and highly important for Mecklenburg historiography. It contained what was probably the first historiographical mention of Abraham ben Jacob's travelogue, a record to which Wigger would return in greater detail some years later.

He quickly acquired the respect of the Grand Duke through his quiet productive scholarship. Further volumes of the "Annals for Mecklenburg followed in quick succession. In 1864 Friedrich Wigger was appointed archivist. In 1876 he was appointed "Counsellor Archivist" ('"Archivrat"') and in 1883 "Privy Counsellor Archivist" ("Geheim Archivrat"). As early as 1876, despite having reached only the job grade of second secretary, Wigger was running the "Mecklenburg History and Antiquities Association" even though his predecessor in respect of these duties, Georg Christian Friedrich Lisch remained formally in post till 1879. In 1880 he took over the running of the association year book, revitalising it, in part, through his own scholarly contributions on the history of Mecklenburg and its ruling dynasty. It was also in 1880 that Friedrich Wigger became Head Archivist of the Grand Ducal Archive.

== Works ==
Most of Friedrich Wigger's research conclusions on the history of Mecklenburg were published in the Year Books of the "Mecklenburg History and Antiquities Association". For a time he was also responsible for the association's quarterly reports. His important "Stammtafeln des Großherzoglichen Hauses von Meklenburg" ("Genealogies of the Grand Ducal House of Mecklenburg"). and his "Verzeichniß der Grabstätten des Großherzoglichen Hauses von Meklenburg" ("Directory of the Grave Stones of the Grand Ducal House of Mecklenburg") are both included in a special 50th anniversary volume of the association which appeared in 1885.

== Recognition ==
- Knight of the Wendish Crown
- Knight of the Red Eagle 4th Class
