= George, Duke of Mecklenburg =

George
- Duke of Mecklenburg
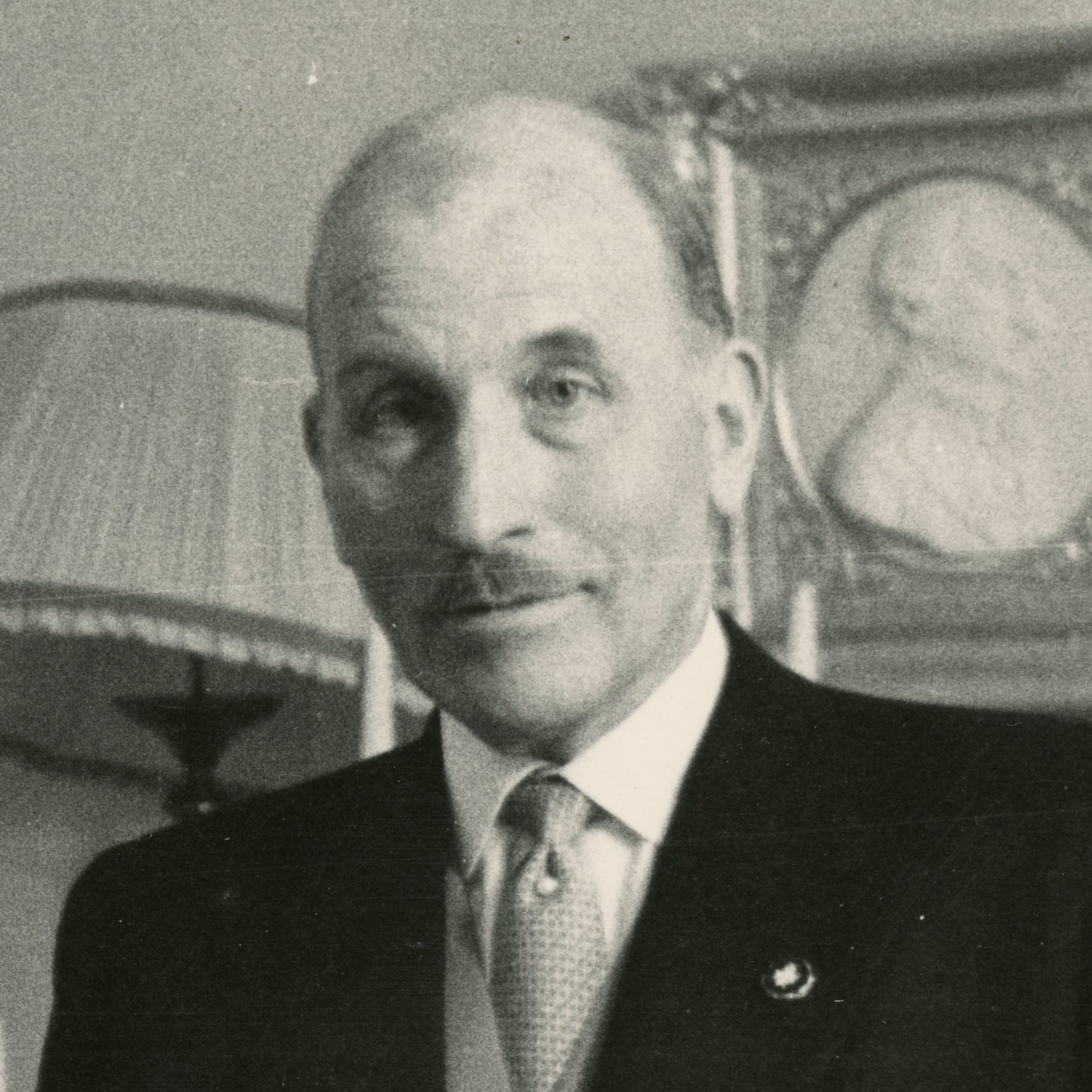
- George in 1954

Head of the House of Mecklenburg-Strelitz
- Period: 6 December 1934 – 6 July 1963
- Predecessor: Duke Charles Michael
- Successor: Duke Georg Alexander
- Born: Count George of Carlow; 5 October [O.S. 23 September] 1899; Oranienbaum, Russia
- Died: 6 July 1963 (aged 63); Sigmaringen, Baden-Württemberg, West Germany
- Spouse: Irina Mikhailovna Raievskya (m. 1920; died 1955) Archduchess Charlotte of Austria (m. 1956)
- Issue: Georg Alexander, Duke of Mecklenburg; Count Alexander; Duchess Helene; Duke Carl Gregor
Names
- Georg Alexander Michael Friedrich Wilhelm Albert Theodor Franz
- House: Mecklenburg-Strelitz
- Father: Duke Georg Alexander of Mecklenburg-Strelitz
- Mother: Natalia Feodorovna Vonljarskaya, Countess of Carlow
- Religion: Roman Catholicism prev. Lutheranism

George, Duke of Mecklenburg (German: Georg Herzog zu Mecklenburg; 5 October [O.S. 23 September] 1899 – 6 July 1963) was the head of the House of Mecklenburg-Strelitz from 1934 until his death. Through his father, he was a descendant of Emperor Paul I of Russia.

== Early life ==
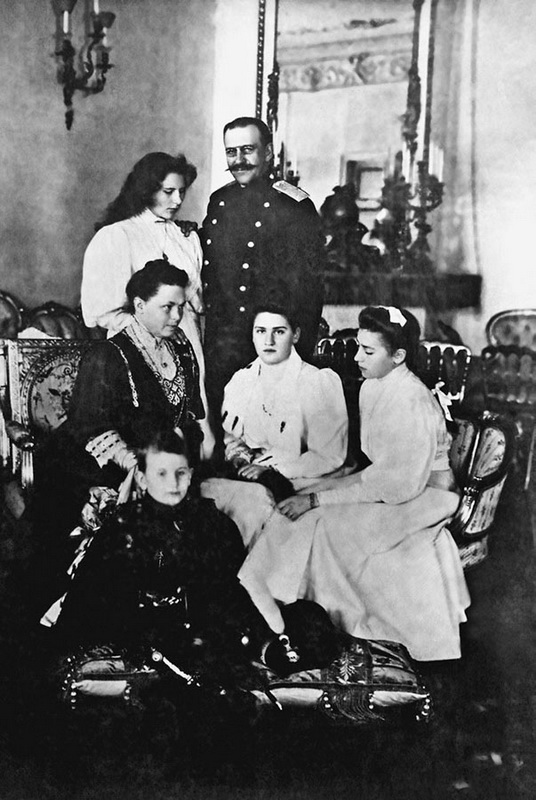
With parents and sisters.

He was born in Oranienbaum as Count George of Carlow; he was the youngest child and only son of Duke George Alexander of Mecklenburg (6 June 1859 – Saint Petersburg, 5 December 1909) and his morganatic wife (m. Remplin, 6 June 1889) Nataliya Fyodorovna Vanlarskaya, Countess of Carlow (Saint Petersburg, 16 May 1858 – Cannes, 14 March 1921), daughter of Fyodor Ardalionovich Vanlarsky (Dagoutze Chavli, Georgia, 23 December 1835 – 2 February 1903) and wife Mariya Fyodorovna Uvarova, and granddaughter of Ardalion Alexeievich Vanlarsky, born in Poretchie, near Smolensk, and wife Tatyana, daughter of Mariya Mikhailovna Litvinova. Because his parents marriage was morganatic, at birth he was denied the title Duke of Mecklenburg; instead his title came from his mother, who had been created Countess of Carlow on 18 March 1890 by her husband's uncle Grand Duke Friedrich Wilhelm of Mecklenburg-Strelitz. When his father died in 1909, his uncle Duke Charles Michael was appointed guardian of George and his sisters Katharina, Marie and Natalia by Grand Duke Adolf Friedrich V of Mecklenburg-Strelitz. After the 1917 October Revolution George and his family fled Russia heading first to France before later moving to Germany.

On 11 September 1928 George was adopted by his uncle Duke Charles Michael, who was the head of the House of Mecklenburg-Strelitz. The adoption was confirmed in the courts in Malchin on 5 October 1928 and as a result he took his uncle and adopted father's surname of Mecklenburg. Following his adoption, George assumed the title Duke of Mecklenburg with the style Serene Highness. This was confirmed by the head of the Imperial House of Russia, Grand Duke Cyril Vladimirovich on 18 July 1929 and recognised on 23 December by Grand Duke Friedrich Franz IV of Mecklenburg-Schwerin. Duke George studied political science at the University of Freiburg and became a Doctor of Economics and Social Sciences.

== Head of the House ==
On 6 December 1934, his uncle Duke Charles Michael died, and George succeeded him as head of the House of Mecklenburg-Strelitz. He lived with his family at Schloss Remplin until April 1940, when the main part of the palace was burnt down. The Grand Ducal family then moved to Grunewald, where they lived until their home was destroyed in an Allied bombing raid in February 1944. In August 1944, George was arrested by the Gestapo and sent to Sachsenhausen concentration camp by the Nazi government, where he remained until February 1945. Following his release, Duke George and his family moved to Sigmaringen at the invitation of Princess Margarete of Hohenzollern (wife of Frederick, Prince of Hohenzollern) in March 1945.

On 18 December 1950 the House of Mecklenburg-Schwerin confirmed the decisions made in 1929 regarding George's title, and he assumed the style of Highness while his status as head of the House of Mecklenburg-Strelitz was also confirmed. At the same time, the Count of Carlow title was abolished.

George died in Sigmaringen, Germany of a heart attack. He was succeeded as head of the Grand Ducal House by his eldest son Duke Georg Alexander.

== Marriages and children ==
Duke George was married firstly in Geneva, Switzerland, on 7 October 1920 to Irina Mikhailovna Raievskya, Countess Tolstoy (Tsarskoye Selo, 18 August 1892 – Sigmaringen, 22 January 1955) the widow of Count Alexander Mikhailovich Tolstoy (Saint Petersburg, 17 January 1888 – Mishkor, Crimea, 19 February 1918), daughter of Mikhail Nikolaievich Rayevsky (1841–1893) and Princess Mariya Grigoryevna Gagarina (Tiflis, 14 June 1851 – Cannes, 2 August 1941) and granddaughter of Nikolai Nikolaievich Rayevsky (14 September 1801 – 1843) and wife (m. 22 January 1839) Anya Mikhailovna Borozdine, and Prince Grigory Grigoryevich Gagarin and wife Sofiya Andreievna Dashkova. Irina was member of the Rayevski family, who were one of heirs of the famed Grigori Potemkin, Prince of Tauria, descending from the childless Prince's sister. The couple had four children though one son Alexander born on 3 August 1922 died at the age of just eighteen days. The children who survived into adulthood were:

- Georg Alexander, Duke of Mecklenburg (27 August 1921 – 26 January 1996) he married Archduchess Ilona of Austria on 20 April 1946 and they were divorced on 12 December 1974. They have four children:
  - Duchess Elisabeth Christina (born 22 March 1947)
  - Duchess Marie Katharina (born 14 November 1949)
  - Duchess Irene (born 18 April 1952)
  - Borwin, Duke of Mecklenburg (born 10 June 1956), who succeeded his father as head of the House of Mecklenburg-Strelitz
- Duchess Helene of Mecklenburg (15 November 1924 – 8 July 1962) she married Hassan Sayed Kamil (1918–1991). on 18 February 1955. They had a daughter:
  - Sheila Kamil (26 July 1958 – 21 March 2018)
- Duke Carl Gregor of Mecklenburg (14 March 1933 – 23 July 2018) he married Princess Maria Margarethe of Hohenzollern-Sigmaringen (daughter of Franz Joseph, Prince of Hohenzollern-Emden) on 18 February 1965.

In May 1956 George became engaged to Archduchess Charlotte of Austria, a daughter of the last Austrian Emperor, Charles I and Zita of Bourbon-Parma. They were married in a civil ceremony on 21 July 1956 in Pöcking, Germany followed by a religious ceremony four days later.

== Ancestry ==
Ancestors of George, Duke of Mecklenburg

8. George, Grand Duke of Mecklenburg-Strelitz
4. Duke Georg August of Mecklenburg-Strelitz
9. Princess Marie of Hesse-Kassel
2. Duke Georg Alexander of Mecklenburg-Strelitz
10. Grand Duke Michael Pavlovich of Russia
5. Grand Duchess Catherine Mikhailovna of Russia
11. Princess Charlotte of Württemberg
1. George, Duke of Mecklenburg
12. Ardalion Alexeievich Vonljarsky
6. Feodor Ardalionovich Vanlarsky
13. Anastasia Mikhailovna Simanovskaya
3. Natalya Feodorovna Vanlarskaya
14. Feodor Feodorovich Uvarov
7. Maria Feodorovna Uvarova
15. Maria Petrovna Zhukova

George, Duke of Mecklenburg House of Mecklenburg-Strelitz Cadet branch of the House of Mecklenburg Born: 5 October 1899 Died: 6 July 1963
Titles in pretence
Preceded by Charles Michael	— TITULAR — Grand Duke of Mecklenburg-Strelitz; 6 December 1934 – 6 July 1963; Reason for succession failure: Grand Duchy abolished in 1918	Succeeded by Georg Alexander
