= Charles Michael, Duke of Mecklenburg =

Charles Michael
- Duke of Mecklenburg
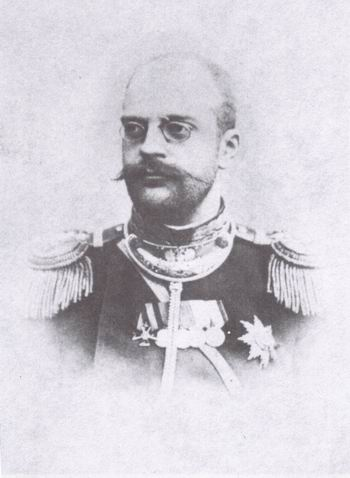

Head of the House of Mecklenburg-Strelitz
- Period: 23 February 1918 – 6 December 1934
- Predecessor: Grand Duke Adolf Friedrich VI
- Successor: Duke Georg
- Born: 17 June [O.S. 5 June] 1863; Oranienbaum, Russian Empire
- Died: 6 December 1934 (aged 71); Remplin, Nazi Germany
Names
- Carl Michael Wilhelm August Alexander
- House: House of Mecklenburg-Strelitz
- Father: Duke Georg August of Mecklenburg-Strelitz
- Mother: Grand Duchess Catherine Mikhailovna of Russia

Charles Michael, Duke of Mecklenburg (German: Carl Michael Herzog zu Mecklenburg; Russian: Михаил Георгиевич; 17 June [O.S. 5 June] 1863 – 6 December 1934) was an officer in the Imperial Russian Army, heir presumptive to the throne of Mecklenburg-Strelitz and from 1918 head of the Grand Ducal House.

== Life in Russia ==
He was born in Oranienbaum, Russia, a grandson of Grand Duke Georg of Mecklenburg-Strelitz via his second son Duke Georg August of Mecklenburg (1824–1876) and his wife Grand Duchess Catherine Mikhailovna of Russia, a granddaughter of Emperor Paul I of Russia. Charles Michael studied at the University of Strasbourg and gained a PhD. As he was born into the Russian branch of the Grand Ducal house of Mecklenburg-Strelitz, Charles Michael and his older brother Duke George Alexander, both served in the Russian Imperial Army with Charles Michael achieving the rank of Lieutenant General. When his brother died in 1909 Charles Michael was appointed the guardian of his children Katharina, Marie, Natalia and Georg by Adolf Friedrich V. From 1908 to 1910, he served as the head of artillery in the 1st Army Corps of the Russian Imperial Army.

On 24 June 1914 two weeks after the death of his cousin Grand Duke Adolf Friedrich V, Charles Michael wrote to the new Grand Duke Adolf Friedrich VI informing him that he wished to renounce his rights to the throne of Mecklenburg-Strelitz. On 7 August shortly after the outbreak of World War I he became a naturalised Russian citizen.

In March 1917 Charles Michael was arrested and made to appear before the Russian Duma. He later fled to the Caucasus region.

== Heir to Strelitz ==
The Grand Duke of Mecklenburg-Schwerin, Friedrich Franz IV wrote to Charles Michael informing him that his cousin Adolf Friedrich VI of Mecklenburg-Strelitz had died on 23 February 1918 and that as he was first in the line of succession he was being called to the throne. A petition to accept the throne was also sent to Charles Michael by the citizens of Mecklenburg-Strelitz as they wanted to maintain their independence and not be united with Mecklenburg-Schwerin. However Charles Michael never received it so he wrote a private letter confirming his desire to renounce his rights to reign in Mecklenburg-Strelitz although the letter did not reach Friedrich Franz IV, who was acting as regent for Mecklenburg-Strelitz, until January 1919 after the fall of the German monarchies. As a result, the succession issue could not be resolved in time and the two Mecklenburg grand duchies became separate free states in the Weimar Republic.

Charles Michael eventually left Russia with his family arriving first in France before going into exile in Denmark. While there he served as Chairman of the Mutual Charitable Society for Russian Officers in Denmark. In 1921 he was paid five million marks by the Mecklenburg government in return for renouncing his claim to the Strelitz throne. In April, 1930 he returned to Germany and took up residence at his estate, Remplin castle.

Charles Michael adopted his nephew Georg, Count of Carlow who was the morganatic son of his older brother Duke George Alexander of Mecklenburg (1859–1909) on 11 September 1928 and confirmed in the courts of Malchin on 5 October 1928. Charles Michael died unmarried in Remplin, Germany and was succeeded as head of the Grand Ducal house by his nephew and adopted son the former Count of Carlow, Duke Georg of Mecklenburg.

== Honours ==
He received the following awards:

- Mecklenburg: Grand Cross of the House Order of the Wendish Crown, with Crown in Ore, 17 June 1880
- Saxe-Weimar-Eisenach: Grand Cross of the Order of the White Falcon, 1884
- Russian Empire:
  - Knight of the Imperial Order of Saint Prince Vladimir, 4th Class, 1890; 3rd Class, 1898; 2nd Class, 1911
  - Knight of the Imperial Order of Saint Andrew the Apostle the First-called, 1904
  - Knight of the Imperial Order of Saint Alexander Nevsky, 1904
  - Knight of the Imperial Order of the White Eagle, 1904
  - Knight of the Imperial Order of Saint Anna, 1st Class, 1904
  - Knight of the Imperial Order of Saint Stanislaus, 1st Class, 1904
  - Knight of the Order of Saint George, 4th Class, 1914
  - St. George's Sword, 1915
- (Saxe-Coburg and Gotha) (Duchy of Saxe-Altenburg) (Saxe-Meiningen) Ernestine duchies: Grand Cross of the Saxe-Ernestine House Order

== Ancestry ==
Ancestors of Charles Michael, Duke of Mecklenburg

8. Charles II, Grand Duke of Mecklenburg-Strelitz
4. George, Grand Duke of Mecklenburg-Strelitz
9. Princess Friederike of Hesse-Darmstadt
2. Duke Georg August of Mecklenburg-Strelitz
10. Prince Frederick of Hesse-Kassel
5. Princess Marie of Hesse-Kassel
11. Princess Caroline of Nassau-Usingen
1. Charles Michael, Duke of Mecklenburg
12. Paul I of Russia
6. Grand Duke Michael Pavlovich of Russia
13. Duchess Sophie Dorothea of Württemberg
3. Grand Duchess Catherine Mikhailovna of Russia
14. Prince Paul of Württemberg
7. Princess Charlotte of Württemberg
15. Princess Charlotte of Saxe-Hildburghausen

== Literature ==
- Mecklenburg-Strelitz – Beiträge zur Geschichte einer Region. Friedland i. Meckl.: Steffen, ^{2}2001 ISBN 3-9807532-0-4
- Grewolls, Grete (2011). Wer war wer in Mecklenburg und Vorpommern. Das Personenlexikon (in German). Rostock: Hinstorff Verlag. p. 4830. ISBN 978-3-356-01301-6.

Charles Michael, Duke of Mecklenburg House of Mecklenburg-Strelitz Cadet branch of the House of Mecklenburg Born: 17 June 1863 Died: 6 December 1934
Titles in pretence
Preceded by Adolf Friedrich VI	— TITULAR — Grand Duke of Mecklenburg-Strelitz; 23 February 1918 – 6 December 1934; Reason for succession failure: Succession issue unresolved, Grand Duchy abolished in 1918	Succeeded by Georg
