= Wasielewski =

The Wasielewski Coat of Arms.

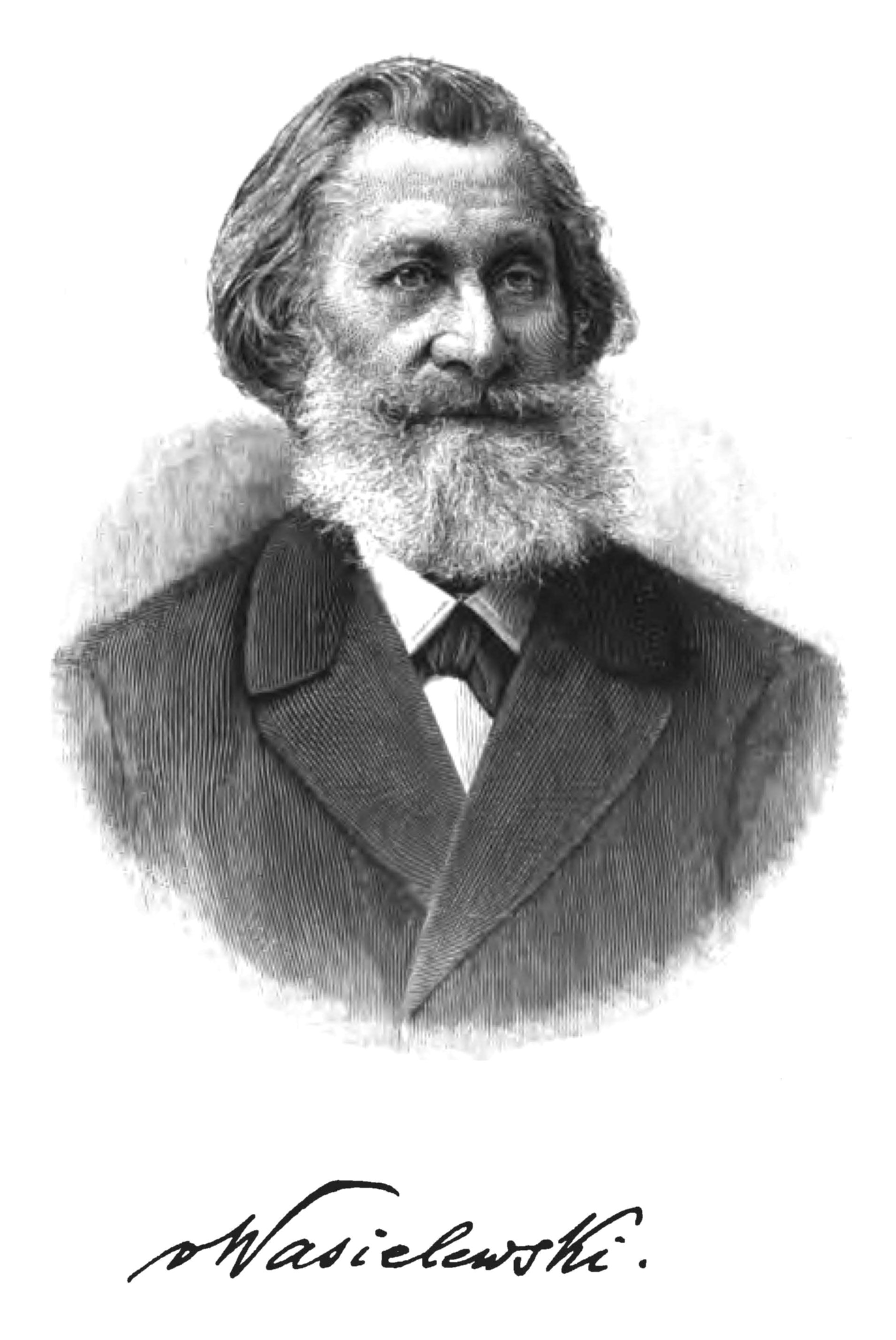
Wilhelm Joseph von Wasielewski

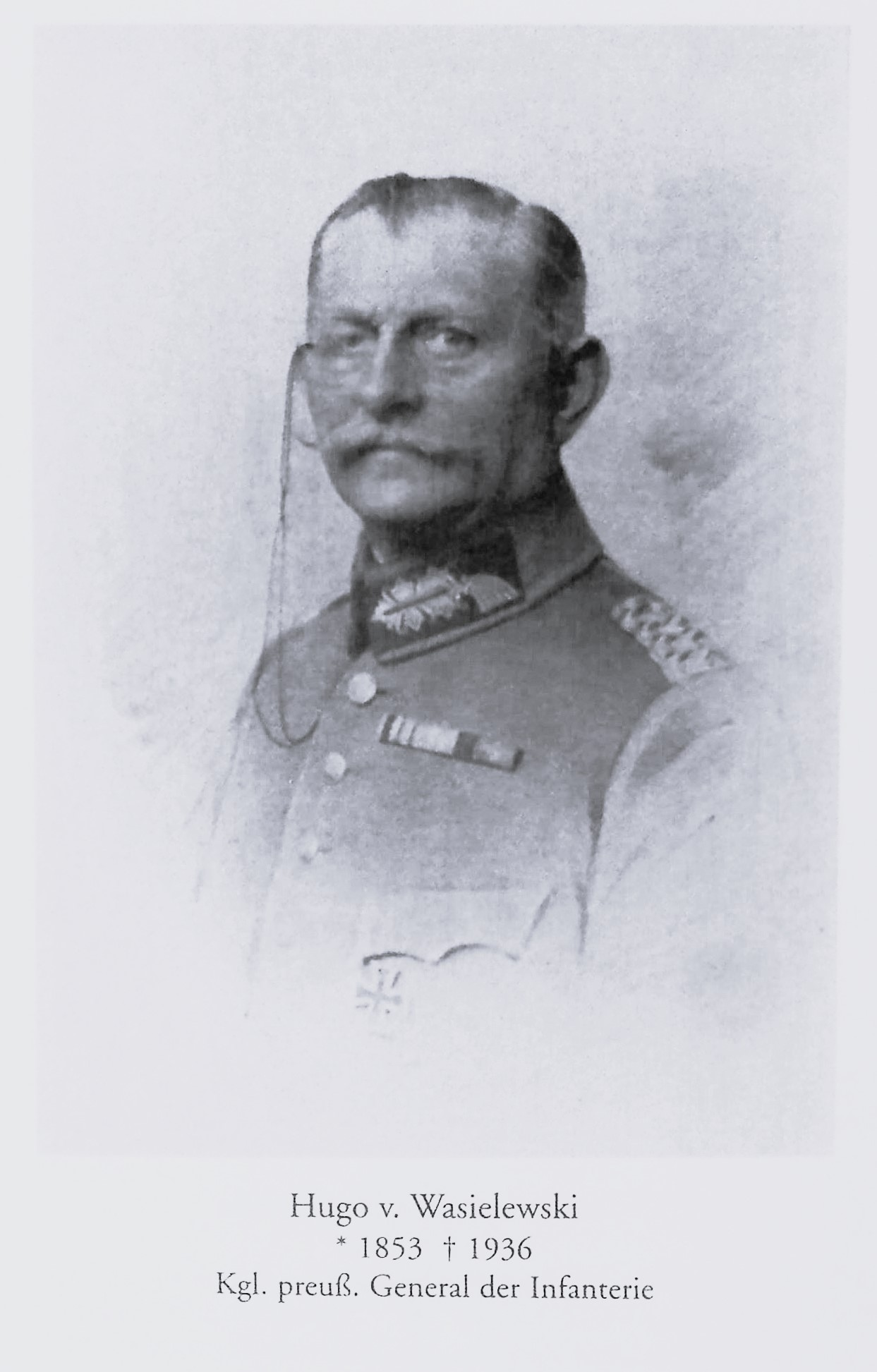
Hugo von Wasielewski.

The Wasielewski family is a German noble family of Polish extraction. Members of the family held significant military positions in the Kingdom of Prussia and later within the German Empire.

== History ==
The Wasielewski family is Catholic and Protestant aristocracy, that commenced with Nicolaus Wasielewski recorded by King Sigismund I. of Poland in 1531. The Prussian line of the family begins with Thaddäus v. Wasielewski (1739–1803) with legitimation as Knights on 26 November 1789.

== Coat of arms ==
The family coat of arms "ROGALA" shows two horns, a buck horn and a buffalo horn. Both horns are standing upright. The buck horn has from 3 to 6 ends. The buffalo horn also described as a Bull or Wisent horn, is closed or open with a mouthpiece as a war or hunting horn. The horns are upright in a split shield. The family colours are red and white.

== Family members ==
- Waldemar von Wasielewski (1875–1959), German writer specialized on Occult, Goethe and musicology
- Wilhelm Joseph von Wasielewski (1822–1896), Violinist, conductor and musicologist
- Hugo von Wasielewski (1853–1936), royal Prussian General of the Infantry (Germany)
- Friedrich Carl von Wasielewski (1857–1938), royal Prussian Major General
- Julius von Wasielewski (1813–1891), royal Prussian Major
- Josef von Wasielewski (1851–1911), royal Prussian Major
- Theodor von Wasielewski (1821–1902), royal Prussian Major
- Carl Heinrich von Wasielewski (1811–1873), royal Prussian Colonel
- Heinrich von Wasielewski (1825–1914), royal Prussian Captain Lieutenant
- Wolfgang von Wasielewski (1881–1954), royal Prussian Colonel

== Literature ==
- Genealogisches Handbuch des Adels, Adelslexikon Band XVII, 2008, Band 144 der Gesamtreihe
- Literature by and about Wasielewski in the German National Library catalogue

== See also ==
- List of szlachta
