= Remplin =

- Ortsteil of Malchin
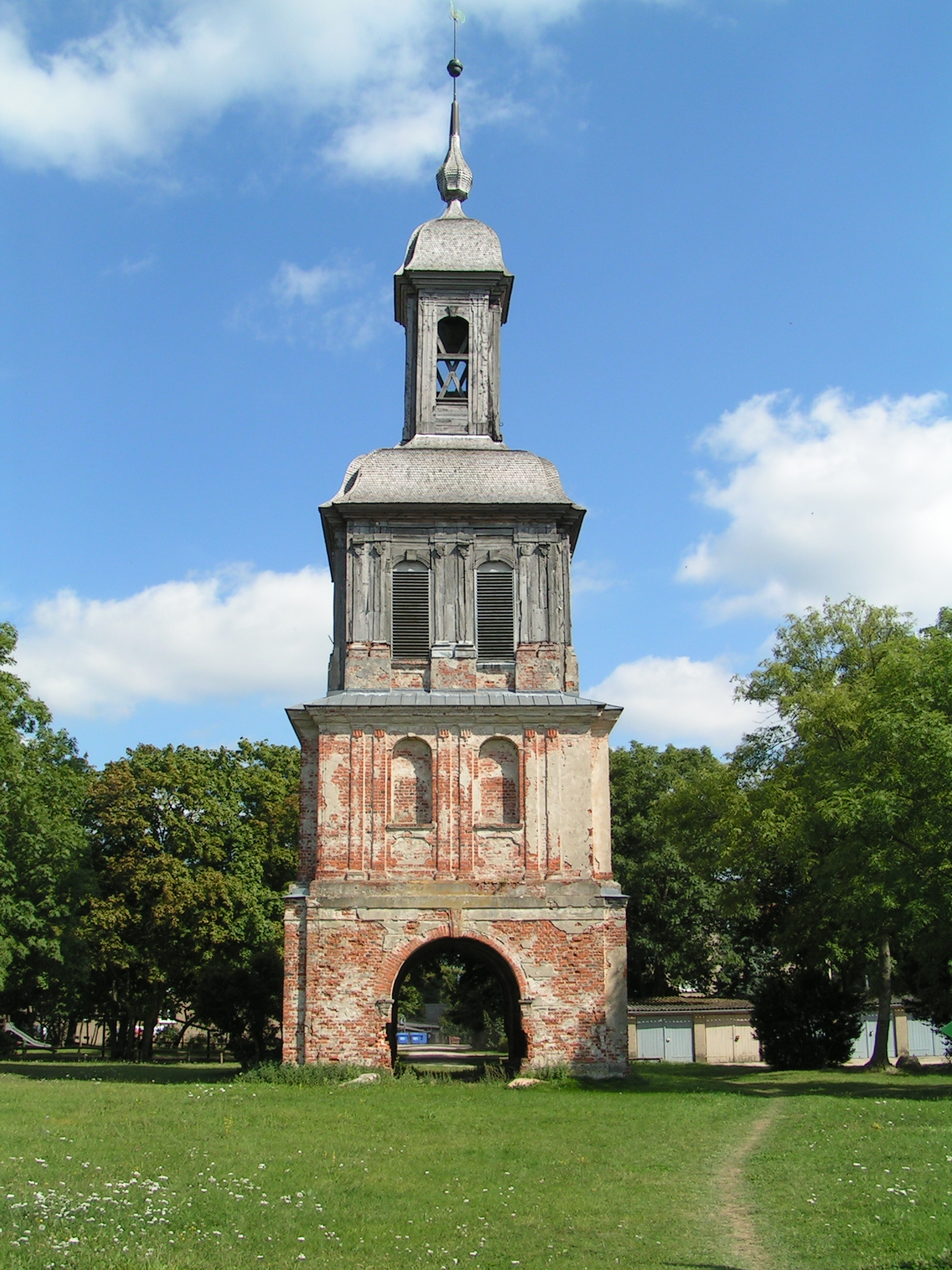
- Remaining baroque gate of Remplin Castle, which was destroyed by fire in 1940

- Coat of arms
- Interactive map of Remplin
- Location within Germany Location within Mecklenburg-Vorpommern
- Coordinates: 53°45′N 12°41′E
- Country: Germany
- State: Mecklenburg-Vorpommern
- District: Mecklenburgische Seenplatte
- Municipality: Malchin

Area
  - Total: 44.41 km^{2} (17.15 sq mi)
- Elevation: 10 m (33 ft)

Population (2006-12-31)
  - Total: 830
  - Density: 19/km^{2} (48/sq mi)
- Time zone: UTC+01:00 (CET)
  - Summer (DST): UTC+02:00 (CEST)
- Postal codes: 17139
- Dialling codes: 03994, 03996
- Vehicle registration: DM
- Website: www.rathaus-malchin.de

Remplin is a village and a former municipality in the Mecklenburgische Seenplatte district, in Mecklenburg-Vorpommern, Germany. Since 7 June 2009, it is part of the municipality Malchin.

== Palace Complex ==
The town includes the remains of a once large palace complex, the Schloss Remplin, which served as the summer home of a member of the Mecklenburg-Strelitz family who lived in Russia, and then as the main residence of the Mecklenburg-Strelitz family until 1940, when it was destroyed by fire. After 1940 the family moved to Berlin and then after World war two, as with every other royal family who held land in what would become East Germany, ended up losing everything they had to the Soviets. After restitution agreements in 2004, some of the surviving palace complex was returned to the family, albeit in terrible condition.

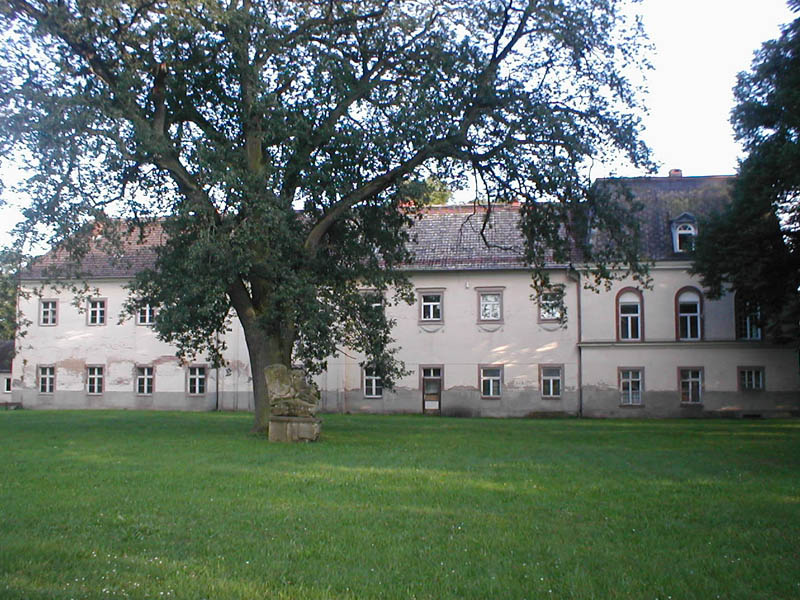
the northwest portion of the original complex

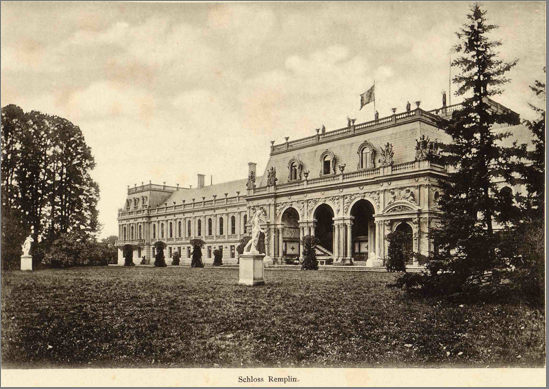
The palace pre 1940

== Notable people ==
- Duke Georg Alexander of Mecklenburg-Strelitz, prince of the House of Mecklenburg-Strelitz and Major General in the Russian army
