= Grand Duchy of Mecklenburg-Strelitz =

German state (1815–1918)

Grand Duchy of Mecklenburg-Strelitz Großherzogtum Mecklenburg-Strelitz (German)
- 1815–1918
- Flag Coat of Arms

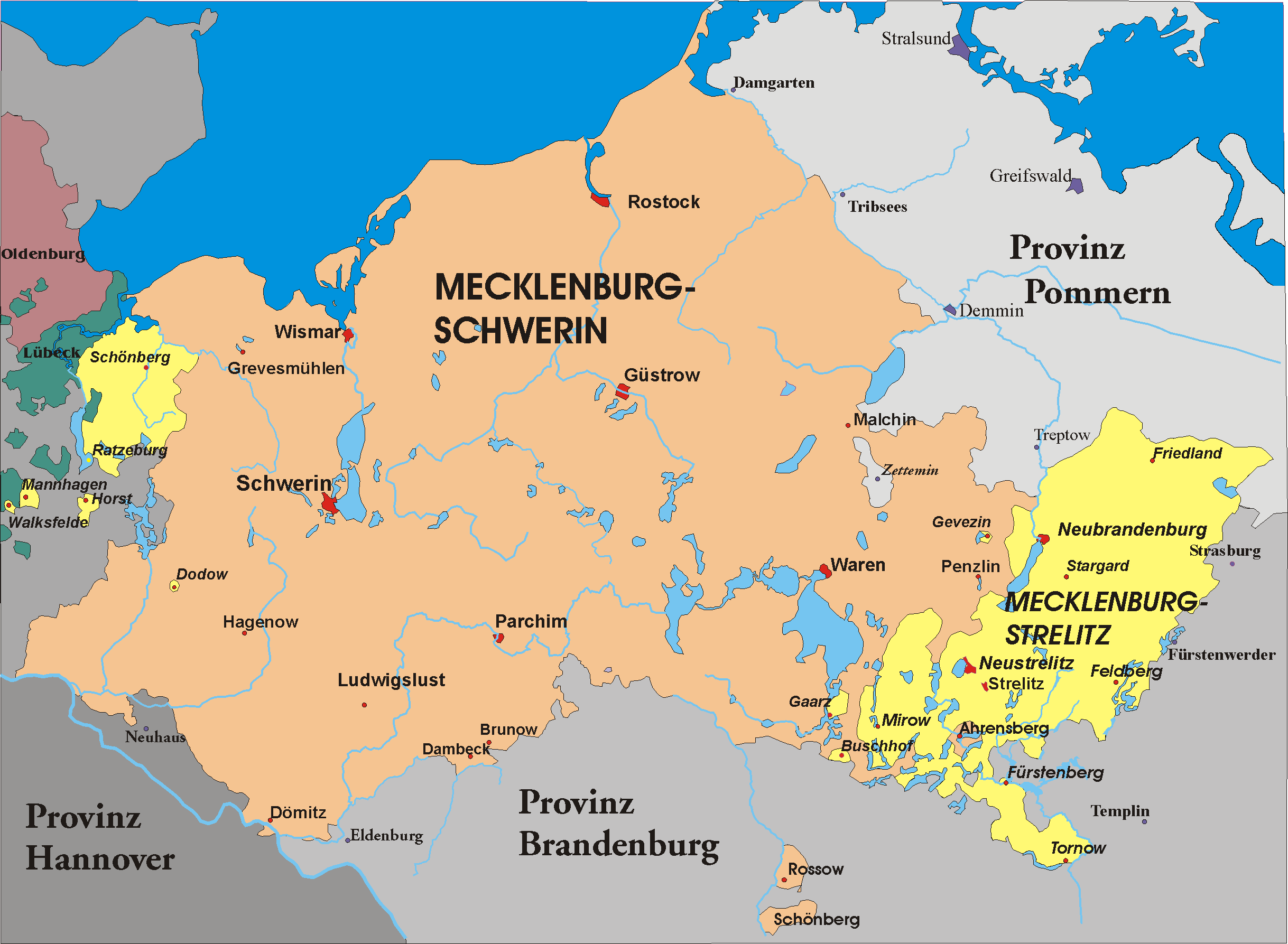
- Map of Mecklenburg-Strelitz (yellow)
- Status: State of the German Confederation (1815–48); State of the German Empire (1848-49) independent state (1849-1850); State of the German Confederation (1850–66); State of the North German Confederation (1867–71); Federal State of the German Empire (1871–1918)
- Capital: Neustrelitz
- Common languages: German, Low German
- Religion: Mecklenburg-Strelitz State Church
- Government: Monarchy
- Grand Duke
  - 1815–1816: Charles II
  - 1816–1860: George
  - 1860–1904: Frederick William
  - 1904–1914: Adolphus Frederick V
  - 1914–1918: Adolphus Frederick VI
- History
  - Raised to Grand Duchy: 1815
  - German Revolution: 1918
Preceded by	Succeeded by
Duchy of Mecklenburg-Strelitz	Free State of Mecklenburg-Strelitz
- Today part of: Germany

The Grand Duchy of Mecklenburg-Strelitz was a territory in Northern Germany, held by the younger line of the House of Mecklenburg residing in Neustrelitz. Like the neighbouring Grand Duchy of Mecklenburg-Schwerin, it was a sovereign member state of the German Confederation and became a federated state of the North German Confederation and finally of the German Empire upon the unification in 1871. After World War I and the German Revolution of 1918–19 it was succeeded by the Free State of Mecklenburg-Strelitz.

== Geography ==
It consisted of two detached parts of the Mecklenburg region: the larger Lordship of Stargard with the residence of Neustrelitz to the southeast of the Grand Duchy of Mecklenburg-Schwerin and the Principality of Ratzeburg on the west. The first was bounded by the Prussian provinces of Pomerania and Brandenburg, the second bordered on the Duchy of Lauenburg (incorporated into the Province of Schleswig-Holstein in 1876) and the territory of the Free City of Lübeck. Major towns beside Neustrelitz included Neubrandenburg, Friedland, Woldegk, Stargard, Fürstenberg, and Wesenberg. The grand duchy also comprised the former commandries of the Knights Hospitaller in Mirow and Nemerow.

== History ==
The Duchy of Mecklenburg-Strelitz, established according to the dynastic Treaty of Hamburg in 1701, adopted the corporative constitution of the sister Duchy of Mecklenburg-Schwerin by an act of September 1755.

During the Napoleonic Wars it was spared a French occupation through the good offices of King Maximilian I Joseph of Bavaria and his minister Maximilian von Montgelas. Duke Charles II declared neutrality in 1806 and later joined the French-dominated Confederation of the Rhine in 1808.

In 1813, Charles left the Confederation and joined Sixth Coalition against Napoleon for the German campaign against him.

After Napoleon's final defeat, Charles joined the German Confederation established by the 1815 Congress of Vienna to succeed the dissolved Holy Roman Empire. He and his cousin Frederick Francis I of Mecklenburg-Schwerin both assumed the title of grand duke (Großherzog von Mecklenburg). The Congress further decreed that Charles and four other princes should receive special compensation totaling 69,000 "souls" in the Saar region. However, Charles ceded his share of this land to Prussia for a monetary payment.

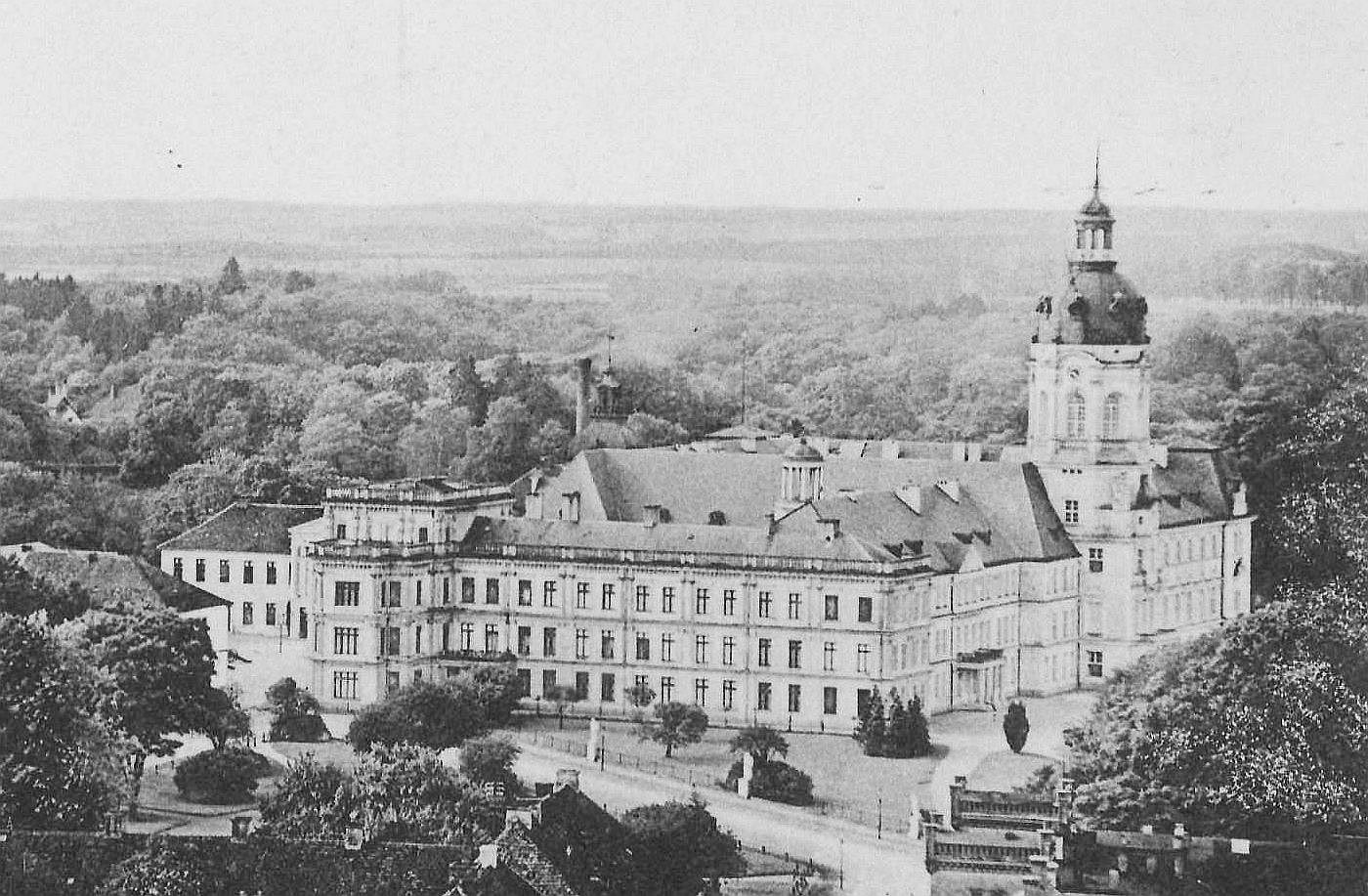
Neustrelitz Palace in 1900

Mecklenburg-Strelitz allied with Prussia in the Austro-Prussian War of 1866, and sent troops to fight on the Prussian side. However, while Grand Duke Frederick William openly denounced Prussia's annexation of the Kingdom of Hanover, Mecklenburg-Strelitz joined the Prussian-dominated North German Confederation and the reconstituted Zollverein.

In the Franco-Prussian War of 1870-71, Mecklenburg-Strelitz again sent troops to aid Prussia.

In 1871, victorious Prussia established the German Empire, and both Mecklenburg-Schwerin and Mecklenburg-Strelitz became States of the German Empire. Mecklenburg-Strelitz returned one member to the Bundesrat (chamber of states). However, the grand duke was still styled Prince of the Wends and the internal government of Mecklenburg-Strelitz remained unmodernized.

Imperial Chancellor Otto von Bismarck mocked the duchy as a safe haven in the face of threatening apocalypse "as everything there happens 50 years later". The grand duchy had always been a government of feudal character. The grand dukes exercised power only through their ministers via an antiquated type of diet representing social classes. It met for a short session each year, and at other times was represented by a committee consisting of the proprietors of knights' estates (Rittergüter), known as the Ritterschaft, and of the Landschaft, which was composed of burgomasters of selected towns. These feudal arrangements meant that the grand duke of Mecklenburg-Strelitz was among the least powerful of the sovereign princes in Germany.

There was now a renewal of agitation for a more democratic constitution, and the German Reichstag gave some countenance to this movement. In 1904 Adolphus Frederick V became grand duke of Mecklenburg-Strelitz. In 1907, the grand duke promised a constitution to the duchy's subjects, but this was met with opposition from the nobility.

== Aftermath ==
The Mecklenburg-Strelitz dynasty ended just prior to the loss of the monarchy in developments associated with World War I. At that time, there existed only two surviving recognized male dynasts of Strelitz, the young Grand Duke Adolphus Frederick VI, and his cousin Charles Michael, who was in Russian service, being a son of Grand Duchess Catherine Mikhailovna. In 1914, before the proclamation of war between Germany and Russia, Duke Charles Michael renounced his German citizenship. On 23 February 1918, Grand Duke Adolf Frederick VI committed suicide, leaving his cousin Charles Michael as heir to the Strelitz throne. Being in Russia, however, Charles Michael did not assume the throne, and in 1918 he wrote to Grand Duke Frederick Francis IV of Mecklenburg-Schwerin, who was acting as regent in Strelitz, stating that he wished to renounce his rights of succession to Strelitz, though the letter was only received by Frederick Francis in 1919 after the end of the German monarchies, so the issue of succession could not be resolved at the time.

The House of Mecklenburg-Strelitz survives to this day, descending from Duke George, the morganatic son of Duke George Alexander with Countess Natalia Carlow and nephew of Duke Charles Michael, who adopted him in 1928. George subsequently assumed the title "Duke of Mecklenburg" (Serene Highness) which was acknowledged by Grand Duke Frederick Francis IV of Mecklenburg-Schwerin. He was later given the style of "Highness" by the House of Mecklenburg-Schwerin. George's grandson Borwin is the present head of the House of Mecklenburg-Strelitz.

The county of Mecklenburg in the U.S. state of North Carolina, which includes the city of Charlotte, is named after the duchy. The city was named for the British Queen Charlotte, who was born a princess of Mecklenburg-Strelitz.
