= House of Mecklenburg =

North German dynasty of Slavic origin

- Country: Mecklenburg
- Founded: 1167; 859 years ago
- Founder: Pribislav
- Current head: Duke Borwin
- Final ruler: Güstrow: Gustav Adolph; Schwerin: Frederick Francis IV; Strelitz: Adolphus Frederick VI
- Titles: Queen of the Netherlands; King of Sweden; Grand Duke, Duke and Lord of Mecklenburg; Prince and Lord of Wenden; Prince of Ratzeburg; Prince of Schwerin; Count of Schwerin; Lord of Rostock; Lord of Stargard; Duke of Finland; Regent of Russia; Regent of Brunswick
- Estates: Mecklenburg-Güstrow; Mecklenburg-Schwerin; Mecklenburg-Strelitz
- Deposition: 1918; 108 years ago (German revolution)
- Branches: Mecklenburg-Güstrow (extinct); Mecklenburg-Schwerin (extinct in male line); Mecklenburg-Strelitz

The House of Mecklenburg, also known as the Nikloting dynasty, is a North German family of Polabian origin that ruled until 1918 in the Mecklenburg region, being among the longest-ruling families of Europe. Queen Juliana of the Netherlands (1909–2004), former Queen of the Netherlands (1948–1980), was an agnatic member of this house.

== Origin ==
The family was established by Pribislav, an Obotrite prince who converted to Christianity and accepted the suzerainty of the Saxon duke Henry the Lion (r. 1142–1180), his fallen father's enemy, and became the lord of Mecklenburg (derived from Mikla Burg, "big castle", their main fortress). The Obotrites were subsequently Germanized. The main branch of the family was elevated in 1347 to ducal rank.

== Coats of arms ==
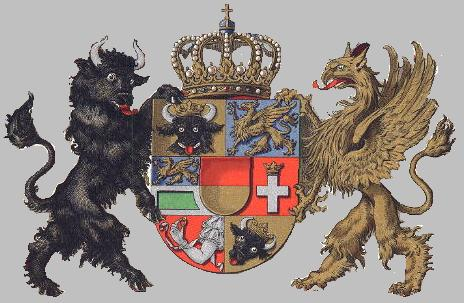
Coat of arms of Mecklenburg split into six quarters and one inescutcheon shield in the middle.

Each field in the coat of arm symbolizes one of the seven high lordly dominions of the state of Mecklenburg: upper-left quarter: Duchy of Mecklenburg, upper-right quarter: Lordship of Rostock, middle-left quarter divided in two: Principality of Schwerin, middle inescutcheon: County of Schwerin, middle-right quarter: Principality of Ratzeburg, lower-left quarter: Lordship of Stargard, and lower-right quarter: Principality of Wenden.

Mecklenburg

Mecklenburg-Güstrow

Mecklenburg-Schwerin

Mecklenburg-Strelitz

== Claims to Swedish throne ==
The Dukes of Mecklenburg pursued from the 14th century a claim to inheritance in Sweden. The Duke of Mecklenburg was a descendant and the heir of two women whom legends tied to Scandinavian royal houses:

- Lord Henry II of Mecklenburg's paternal great-grandmother, a Scandinavian noblewoman named Christina, the wife of Henry Borwin II, Lord of Mecklenburg (d. 1226), was a daughter of King Sverker II of Sweden by his first wife. Christina was the mother of John I of Mecklenburg, whose son was Henry I, Lord of Mecklenburg.
- Lord Henry II of Mecklenburg's maternal grandmother, a lady named Marianna, was the first wife of Duke Barnim I of Pomerania (d. 1278), Lord of Wolgast, as well as sister of King Eric XI of Sweden. Marianna had given birth to an only surviving child, a daughter named Anastasia of Pomerania, who then became the wife of Henry I of Mecklenburg (d. 1302) and mother of Henry II.

The Sverker dynasty had long been extinct, having lost the throne ultimately to Eric XI. The male dynasty of Eric X was already extinct, and issue of his other daughters had been sidestepped by Birger Jarl, the husband of his daughter (the only one still alive in 1250), Ingeborg Eriksdotter of Sweden. Birger took great care to secure the kingship for his own sons.

The Dukes of Mecklenburg's claim to the Swedish throne became reality during a brief reign: Henry II's son Albert II, Duke of Mecklenburg (1318–79), married a kinswoman, a Scandinavian heiress named Euphemia of Sweden and Norway (born 1317 and died 1370). The couple's second son duke Albert III deposed his uncle from the Swedish throne, and ascended as king.

Margaret I of Denmark chose Eric of Pomerania as her heir. Eric descended from the elder brother of Albert III. Monarchs of the Kalmar union were all cognatic descendants of the House of Mecklenburg.

The agnatic House of Mecklenburg, descended from Euphemia's youngest son Magnus I, Duke of Mecklenburg, continued to keep their claim to the throne, and occasionally stirred the situation in Scandinavia.

== Claims to Norway ==
The Kingdom of Norway (872–1397) was the only medieval Scandinavian realm whose kingship was hereditary, not elective. Already when Olav IV of Norway was young and his mother Margaret was regent, the Dukes of Mecklenburg advanced their claims.

The Dukes of Mecklenburg's claim to the Norwegian throne was based on their descent from Euphemia of Sweden, granddaughter of Haakon V of Norway.

When Olav IV died in 1387, Norway was without a monarch but under the regency of Margaret. She soon chose an heir, Eric of Pomerania, whose mother Maria of Mecklenburg had been Euphemia's eldest granddaughter.

When Eric's nephew king Christopher died (before the death of the deposed Eric III of Norway), after some hiatus another magnate, Christian VIII of Oldenburg, descended in the female line from Euphemia and the Mecklenburg family (Euphemia's daughter's great-grandson), was chosen as king of Norway in 1450, this time passing over his cousin and male-line rival, Duke Henry the Fat of Mecklenburg.

The Dukes of Mecklenburg continued to regard themselves as the rightful heirs to the throne of Norway but they were unable to gain the kingdom from the Oldenburgs.

== Modern states in Mecklenburg ==
Around 1711, a treaty was signed between the Dukes of Mecklenburg and the Elector of Brandenburg through which the elector was recognized as the next heir of Mecklenburg after the male lines of the genealogical house of Mecklenburg. Thereby the electors, later kings of Prussia, regarded themselves as having become members of the House of Mecklenburg and started to use its titles, e.g. Duke of Mecklenburg, among their own titulary.

The legality of that treaty concession has been, and still is under discussion, because not all of the then agnates of the House participated in the deed, and at least one of them was then underage.

In the 17th and 18th centuries, the duchy was divided several times between agnates of the ducal house. Mecklenburg-Schwerin, Mecklenburg-Güstrow and Mecklenburg-Strelitz were typical partition principalities. Until the late 18th century, most parts had returned to the senior branch (Schwerin), after which the patrimony was divided in two states until the very end of monarchy in Germany:

- Mecklenburg-Schwerin
- Mecklenburg-Strelitz

These were elevated to grand duchies by recognition of the Congress of Vienna. In 1918, less than a year before the elimination of the monarchy, the main line of Strelitz became extinct and the then Grand Duke of Mecklenburg-Schwerin stepped in as regent, but succession questions (there was a junior Strelitz branch living in Russia) were not solved until the small monarchies both were dissolved to republics.

== House of Mecklenburg today ==
=== House of Mecklenburg-Schwerin ===
The House of Mecklenburg-Schwerin became extinct in the male line on 31 July 2001 with the death of Hereditary Grand Duke Frederick Francis of Mecklenburg-Schwerin, the eldest son and heir of the last grand duke, Frederick Francis IV.

The remaining members of the House of Mecklenburg-Schwerin are the daughters of Duke Christian Ludwig, the second son of Frederick Francis IV, the Duchesses Donata (born 1956) and Edwina (born 1960).

=== House of Mecklenburg-Strelitz ===
With the extinction of Schwerin, Mecklenburg-Strelitz is now the only surviving branch of the Grand Ducal house in the male line. The current head of this house is Borwin, Duke of Mecklenburg. His grandfather was Count Georg of Carlow, the morganatic son of Duke George Alexander of Mecklenburg (1859–1909). Georg was adopted in 1928 by his uncle Duke Charles Michael of Mecklenburg, the head of the House of Mecklenburg-Strelitz. He then assumed the title and style of "His Serene Highness The Duke of Mecklenburg", which was confirmed by the head of the Imperial House of Russia, Grand Duke Cyril Vladimirovich on 18 July 1929 and recognised on 23 December by Grand Duke Friedrich Franz IV of Mecklenburg-Schwerin. He succeeded his uncle as head of the house on 6 December 1934 and was granted the style of Highness on 18 December 1950.

In addition to Duke Borwin, the current members of the House of Mecklenburg-Strelitz are his wife Duchess Alice (née Wagner; born 1959); their children Duchess Olga (born 1988), the Dukes Alexander (born 1991) and Michael (born 1994); Duke Alexander's son, Duke Leopold (born 2023); and Duke Borwin's sisters, the Duchesses Elisabeth Christine (born 1947), Marie Catherine (born 1949) and Irene (born 1952).

== States ruled by the House of Mecklenburg ==
- Mecklenburg (1167–1918), with:
  - Mecklenburg-Stargard (1348–1471)
  - Mecklenburg-Schwerin (1352–1918, with interruptions)
  - Mecklenburg-Güstrow (1621–1701)
  - Mecklenburg-Strelitz (1701–1918)
- Werle (1235–1436)
- Sweden (1364–1389)
- United Baltic Duchy (November 1918)
- Netherlands (1948–1980) – via Queen Juliana of the Netherlands (agnatic)

== See also ==
- List of dukes and grand dukes of Mecklenburg

== Sources ==
- Ilka Minneker: Vom Kloster zur Residenz – Dynastische Memoria und Repräsentation im spätmittelalterlichen und frühneuzeitlichen Mecklenburg. Rhema-Verlag, Münster 2007, ISBN 978-3-930454-78-5
- Erstling, Frank; Frank Saß; Eberhard Schulze (April 2001). "Das Fürstenhaus von Mecklenburg-Strelitz". Mecklenburg-Strelitz, Beiträge zur Geschichte einer Region (in German). Friedland: Steffen. ISBN 3-9807532-0-4.
- Huberty, Michel; Alain Giraud; F. et B. Magdelaine (1991). L'Allemagne Dynastique, Tome VI : Bade-Mecklembourg. Le Perreux-sur-Marne: Giraud. ISBN 978-2-901138-06-8.

— Royal house — House of Mecklenburg
New title	Ruling House of Mecklenburg; 1167–1918	Declared a Republic
Preceded by House of Bjälbo	Ruling House of Sweden; 1364–1389	Succeeded by Kalmar Union
New title	Ruling House of Mecklenburg-Güstrow; 1621–1701	Partitioned into Mecklenburg-Schwerin and Mecklenburg-Strelitz
New title Created from Mecklenburg-Güstrow	Ruling House of Mecklenburg-Strelitz; 1701–1918	Declared a Republic
Preceded by House of Orange-Nassau	Ruling House of the Netherlands; 1948–1980	Succeeded by House of Lippe-Biesterfeld
