= Crown of Prussia =

"Crown of Prussia" may refer to:

- the Crown of Frederick I
- the Crown of Wilhelm II, also known as the Hohenzollern Crown
- Crown of Prussia, a synecdoche (naming the whole by the part) for King of Prussia

== See also ==
- Order of the Crown (Prussia), an order of chivalry
