= Santos (surname) =

Romance language surname

- Pronunciation: [ˈsantos] (Spanish and Italian), [ˈsɐ̃tus, -tuʃ] (Portuguese), [ˈsɐntɔs] (Maltese)

Origin
- Origin: Sanctorum (Latin for Saints)
- Meaning: Saints
- Region of origin: Spain, Italy, Portugal, Malta

Other names
- Variant forms: dos Santos, de los Santos, de Santos, e Santos, de Santo, del Santo

Santos is a Spanish, Italian, Portuguese, and Maltese surname with several variations. The English translation of Santos is Saints. A singular version, Santo, may occur. Its origin is Christian, from the Latin sanctus.

There are also other Iberian and Italo-Romance grammatical variants, De Santo, De Santos, Del Santo, Santi, Santis, Santiz, Senti, Sentis, among others, which are also very popular in countries including Argentina, Chile and Uruguay.

Notable individuals with the surname include:

== Art ==
- Cesar Santos (born 1982) Cuban-American artist and portrait painter
- Jesse Santos (1928–2013), Filipino comics artist
- Thiago dos Santos Martins (born 1988), Brazilian actor and singer-songwriter

== Business and commerce ==
- Emanuele Rodriguez dos Santos (c. 1702–1764) Portuguese-Roman architect
- Isabel dos Santos (born 1973), Angolan businesswoman
- Silvio Santos (1930–2024), Brazilian television presenter and business magnate

== Military ==
- Alberto Santos-Dumont (1873–1932), Brazilian aviation pioneer
- Alfredo M. Santos (1905–1990), Filipino AFP chief of staff
- Paulino Santos, (1890–1945), Filipino soldier
- Santos Benavides (1823–1891), Mexican-American Confederate States army officer

== Music ==
- Enrique Santos Discépolo (1901–1951), Argentine musician
- Henry Santos Jeter (born 1979), Dominican singer and composer/vocals for Aventura
- Jay Santos, Spanish dance singer
- Joly Braga Santos (1924–1988), Portuguese composer and conductor
- José Manuel Cerqueira Afonso dos Santos (1929–1987), known as Zeca Afonso, Portuguese singer, composer and poet
- Jovino Santos-Neto (born 1954), Brazilian musician
- Lenny Santos (born 1979), Dominican-American guitarist, producer/arranger for Aventura
- Lulu Santos (born 1953), Brazilian singer and guitarist
- Mandy Santos, Spanish singer-songwriter
- Matthew Santos (born 1982), American alternative music singer
- Max Santos (born 1982), American bass guitarist, musical arranger and rapper
- Tony Santos, Spanish funk/R&B singer
- Patricio Santos Fontanet (born 1979), Argentine singer-songwriter
- Santos (DJ) (Sante Pucello, born 1971), Italian DJ

== Personalities ==
- Birgite dos Santos (born 1989), Angolan model
- Cayetano Santos Godino (1896–1944), Argentine serial killer
- Riza Santos (born 1987), Filipino-Canadian beauty queen

== Poetry and literature ==
- Artur Carlos Maurício Pestana dos Santos (born 1941), known as Pepetela, Angolan writer
- Ary dos Santos (1937–1984), Portuguese poet
- Domingo Santos (1941–2018), Spanish writer
- José dos Santos Ferreira (1919–1993), Portuguese-Macanese writer
- Lúcio Alberto Pinheiro dos Santos (1889–1950), Portuguese philosopher
- Mayra Santos-Febres (born 1966), Puerto-Rican writer
- Patricia Santos Marcantonio, American fiction writer

== Politics ==
- Antonio da Costa Santos (1952–2001), Brazilian architect and politician
- António dos Santos Ramalho Eanes (born 1935), Portuguese general and politician
- Asela de los Santos (1929–2020), Cuban teacher, revolutionary and politician, and served as First Minister of Education in the government of the Communist Party of Cuba
- Bob Santos (1934–2016), American activist for Seattle's Chinatown-International District
- Conrad Santos (1934–2016), Canadian politician
- Délio dos Santos (died 2020), Brazilian politician
- Domitila, Marchioness of Santos (1797–1867), Brazilian noblewoman and the mistress of Emperor Pedro I of Brazil
- Ely Santos (born 1977), Brazilian politician
- Farley Santos, American politician from Connecticut
- Francis E. Santos, Chamoru (Guam) politician
- Francisco R. Santos (1930–93), Chamoru (Guam) politician
- Eduardo Santos Montejo (1888–1974), owned the El Tiempo newspaper, and served as the President of Colombia from August 1938 to August 1942
- George Santos (born 1988), American politician
- Hélio de Oliveira Santos (born 1950), Brazilian physician and politician
- Isabel Santos (born 1968), Portuguese politician
- José Eduardo dos Santos (1942–2022), Angolan politician and former president of Angola
- José Santos Guardiola Bustillo (1816–1862), Honduran politician and two-term President of Honduras
- José Santos Zelaya (1853–1919), Nicaraguan politician
- Juan Manuel Santos Calderón (born 1951), Colombian president
- Lena Lorraine Santos (1928–2004), American secretary, clubwoman, and civil rights advocate
- Manuel António dos Santos (born 1943), Portuguese politician
- Maria Isabel Coelho Santos (born 1968), Portuguese politician
- Tancredo dos Santos (born 1988), Brazilian politician
- Teresita Santos (born 1959), politician from the Northern Mariana Islands

== Religion ==
- Lúcia dos Santos (1907–2005), known as Sister Lúcia of Jesus, Portuguese Roman Catholic Carmelite nun and seer of Our Lady of Fatima
- Rufino Jiao Santos (1908–1973), Filipino cardinal, former Archbishop of Manila

== Sport ==
=== American football ===
- Cairo Santos (born 1991), Brazilian American football placekicker
- Ricky Santos (born 1984), American Canadian football quarterback
- Todd Santos (born 1964), American footballer

=== Association football ===
- Alejandro de los Santos (1902–1982), Argentine footballer
- Aresandoro dos Santos (born 1977), Brazilian-Japanese footballer
- André Bernardes Santos (born 1989), Portuguese midfielder footballer
- André Santos (born 1983), Brazilian footballer
- Artur Santos (footballer) (1931–2025), Portuguese footballer
- Cristiano Ronaldo dos Santos Aveiro (born 1985), Portuguese footballer
- Djalma Santos (1929–2013), Brazilian footballer
- Fausto dos Santos (1905–1939), Brazilian footballer
- Fernando Castro Santos (born 1952), Spanish football manager
- Fernando Santos (born 1954), Portuguese footballer and football manager
- Giovani dos Santos (born 1989), Mexican footballer
- Gonzalo de los Santos Rosa (born 1976), Uruguayan retired footballer who played as a defensive midfielder, and is a manager
- Héctor Santos (footballer) (1944–2019), Uruguayan footballer
- José Mário dos Santos Mourinho Félix, Portuguese football manager
- Leslie George Santos, Hong Kong footballer
- Marc Dos Santos (born 1977), Canadian football manager
- Neymar da Silva Santos, Jr. (born 1992), Brazilian footballer
- Nílton Santos (1925–2013), Brazilian football player
- Paulo Jorge dos Santos Futre (born 1966), Portuguese footballer
- Ricardo Izecson dos Santos Leite (born 1982), Brazilian footballer known as "Kaká"

=== Athletics ===
- Alison dos Santos (born 2000), Brazilian runner
- Gilmar Santos (born 1970), Brazilian middle-distance runner
- Héctor Santos (athlete) (born 1998), Spanish long jumper
- Luíz Antônio dos Santos (born 1964), Brazilian long-distance runner
- Rosângela Santos (born 1990), Brazilian sprinter
- Sueli dos Santos (born 1965), Brazilian javelin thrower
- Wanda dos Santos (1932–2025), Brazilian hurdler

=== Aquatics ===
- Ricardo Santos, Brazilian windsurfer

=== Baseball ===
- Alex Santos (baseball) (born 2002), American baseball player
- Sergio Santos (born 1983), American baseball player
- Victor Irving Santos (born 1976), Dominican-American baseball player
- Winston Santos (baseball) (born 2002), Dominican baseball player

=== Basketball ===
- Márcio Santos (born 2002), Brazilian basketball player

=== Fighting ===
- Bob Santos, American boxing trainer, manager, and cutman
- Edgardo Santos (born 1970), Puerto Rican professional boxer
- Junior dos Santos (born 1984), Brazilian MMA fighter
- Manny Santos (1940–2013), Tongan/New Zealand boxer of the 1960s and 70s

=== Golf ===
- Ricardo Santos, Portuguese golfer

=== Gymnastics ===
- Daiane dos Santos (born 1983), Brazilian gymnast

=== Volleyball ===
- Ricardo Santos, Brazilian beach volleyball player
- Sérgio Santos (born 1975), also known as Serginho or Escadinha, Brazilian volleyball player
- Sidnei dos Santos, Jr. (born 1982), Brazilian volleyball player better known as Sidão
- Yanelis Santos (born 1986), Cuban volleyball player

== Stage and screen ==
- Charo Santos (born 1955), Filipino actress and former president of ABS-CBN Network
- Joe Santos (1931–2016), American actor
- Judy Ann Santos (born 1978), Filipino actress
- Lucélia Santos (born 1957), Brazilian actress, director and producer
- María Santos (1899–1949), Argentine actress
- Nelson Pereira dos Santos (1928–2018), Brazilian movie director
- Pablo Santos (1987–2006), Mexican actor
- Roberto Santos (1928–1987), Brazilian film director
- Vilma Santos (born 1953), Filipino actress

== S.T.E.M ==
- Eunice Santos, American computer scientist
- Keity Souza Santos, Brazilian immunologist and international member of the American Academy of Allergy, Asthma & Immunology

== Fictional characters ==
- Santos Family, in the American soap opera Guiding Light
  - Danny Santos
  - Michelle Bauer Santos
- Matt Santos, character on the United States television show The West Wing
- Manny Santos (Degrassi: The Next Generation), character on the Canadian television show Degrassi: The Next Generation
- Nadia Santos, a fictional character in the television series Alias
- In the ABC daytime drama All My Children
  - Julia Santos
  - Mateo Santos
  - Maria Santos
  - Rosa Santos
- In the GMA Network daytime drama Abot-Kamay na Pangarap
  - Analyn Santos
  - Lyneth Santos
- Trinity Santos, fictional character in the American medical drama TV series The Pitt

== See also ==
- Santos (disambiguation)
