= Tancred (disambiguation) =

Tancred is a Germanic given name, once common in the Middle Ages.

Tancred may also refer to:

- Tancred of Galilee, a leader of the First Crusade who became the first Prince of Galilee
  - Tancred's Tower, former tower in the Old City of Jerusalem, named after Tancred of Galilee
- Tancred of Hauteville, a Norman lord who was the great-great grandfather of Tancred of Galilee
- Tancred (novel), a novel published in 1847 by Benjamin Disraeli, with a contemporary setting
- Tancred (play), a nineteenth-century play by John Augustus Stone, based on the crusader
- Tancred (Judges Guild), a 1980 role-playing game adventure
- Lawson-Tancred Baronets, title held by ancient Yorkshire family since 1662
- Tancred, California, in Yolo County, USA
- Tancred (band), the band project of Jess Abbott

== See also ==
- Tancrède (disambiguation), the French form
- Tancredi (disambiguation), the Italian form
- Tancredo (disambiguation), the Spanish and Portuguese form
