= Tancred =

Tancred or Tankred is a masculine given name of Germanic origin that comes from thank- (thought) and -rath (counsel), meaning "well-thought advice". It was used in the High Middle Ages mainly by the Normans (see French Tancrède) and especially associated with the House of Hauteville after the Norman conquest of southern Italy. It is rare today as a first name, but still common as a Norman surname: Tanqueray, Tanquerey, Tanqueret. Its Italian form is Tancredi and in Latin it is Tancredus. Its Italian patronymic is also Tancredi.

== People with the given name ==
In chronological order:

- Tancred, Torthred, and Tova (died 869 or 870), Anglo-Saxon siblings who were saints, hermits, and martyrs
- Tancred of Hauteville (c. 980–1041), minor Norman lord, founder of the Hauteville family
- Tancred of Galilee (1075–1112), a leader of the First Crusade
- Tancred, Count of Syracuse (fl. 1104)
- Tancred of Conversano, Count of Brindisi; banished 1133
- Tancred, Prince of Bari (c. 1119–between 1138 and 1140), son of Roger II of Sicily, and Prince of Taranto from 1132 to 1138
- Tancred of Sicily (1138–1194), King of Sicily
- Tancred Tancredi (1185–1241), also called Tancred of Siena, Dominican friar
- Tancred of Bologna (c. 1185–1230/1236), Dominican canonist
- Tancred Robinson (c.1658–1748), English physician
- Tancrède Auguste (1856–1913), 20th President of Haiti from August 8, 1912 until he died in office on May 2, 1913
- Tancred Ibsen (1893–1978), Norwegian officer, pilot, film director, and screenwriter
- Tankred Dorst (1925–2017), German writer

== Fictional characters ==
- Tancred of Salerno, in Boccaccio's Decameron novella collection
- Tancred, in the Italian epic poem La Gerusalemme liberata (1581) by Torquato Tasso
- Tancred, in the 1591 English play Tancred and Gismund
- Tancred, Lord Montacute, title character of Benjamin Disraeli's 1847 novel Tancred
- Tancredi Falconeri, in Giuseppe Tomasi di Lampedusa's 1958 novel The Leopard
- Tancred Torsson, in Jenny Nimmo's Children of the Red King series
- Tancred, in the computer game Diablo 2
- Tancred, in the video game Summoner, known as the "King of Fleas"
- Sir Tancred Beauleigh, the father of the title character in Edgar Jepson's Tinker stories
- Tandredi Recchi, the family patriarch in the Luca Guadagnino 2009 film I Am Love
- Father Tancred, a minor character in the 2010 film Robin Hood
- Tancred Cappelen-Jensen, in Bernhard Borge's novel "Døde menn går i land"
- Sara Tancredi, one of the protagonists in the American crime drama television show Prison Break

== Ships ==
- HMS Tancred (1917)
- HMS Tancred (W 104)

== Band ==
- Tancred, American rock band

== See also ==
- Tancrède (disambiguation)
- Tancredi (disambiguation)
- Tancredo (disambiguation)
