= Prussian Crown Jewels =

Regalia of the monarchs of Prussia

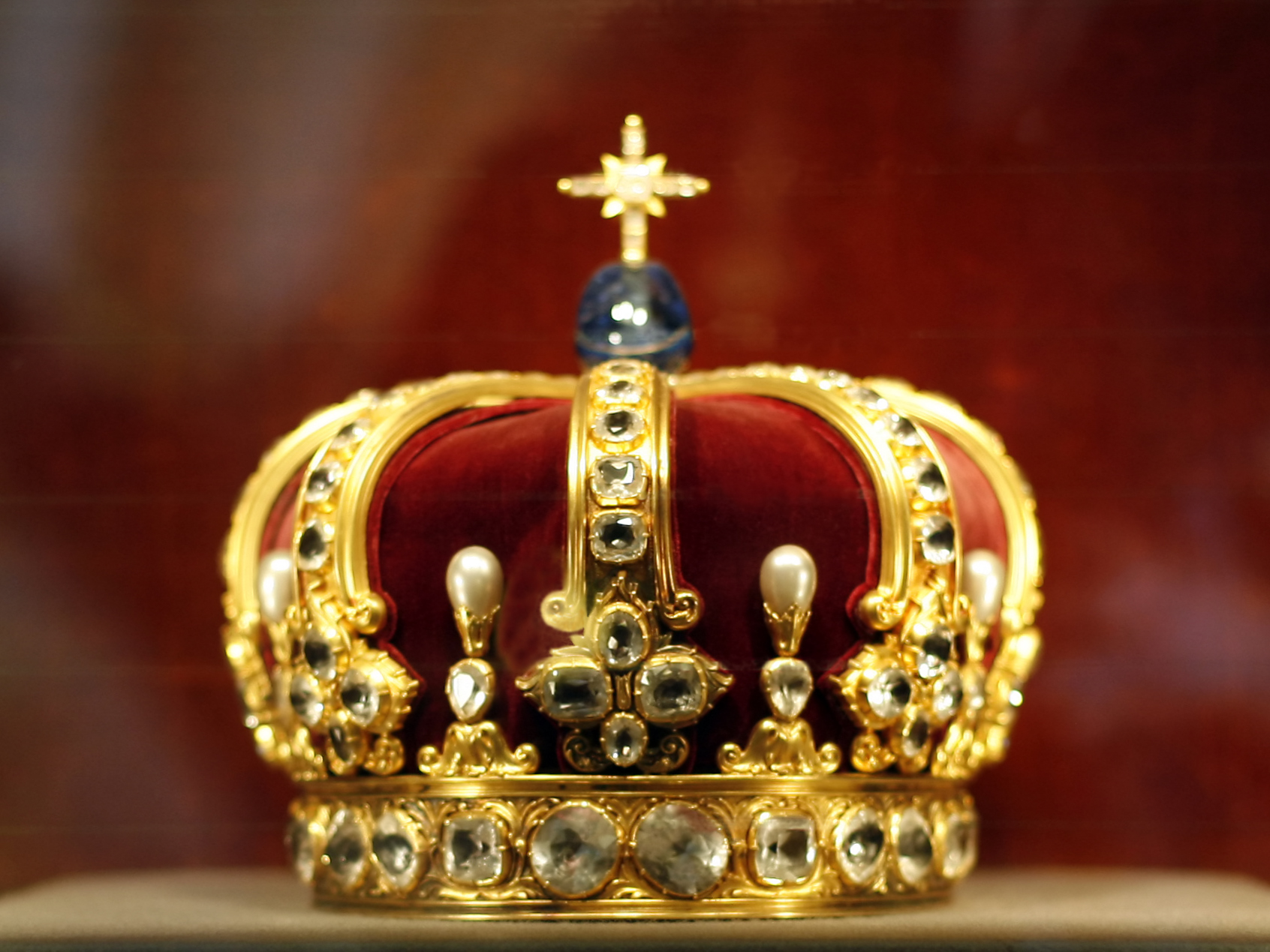
Crown of William II, Hohenzollern Castle

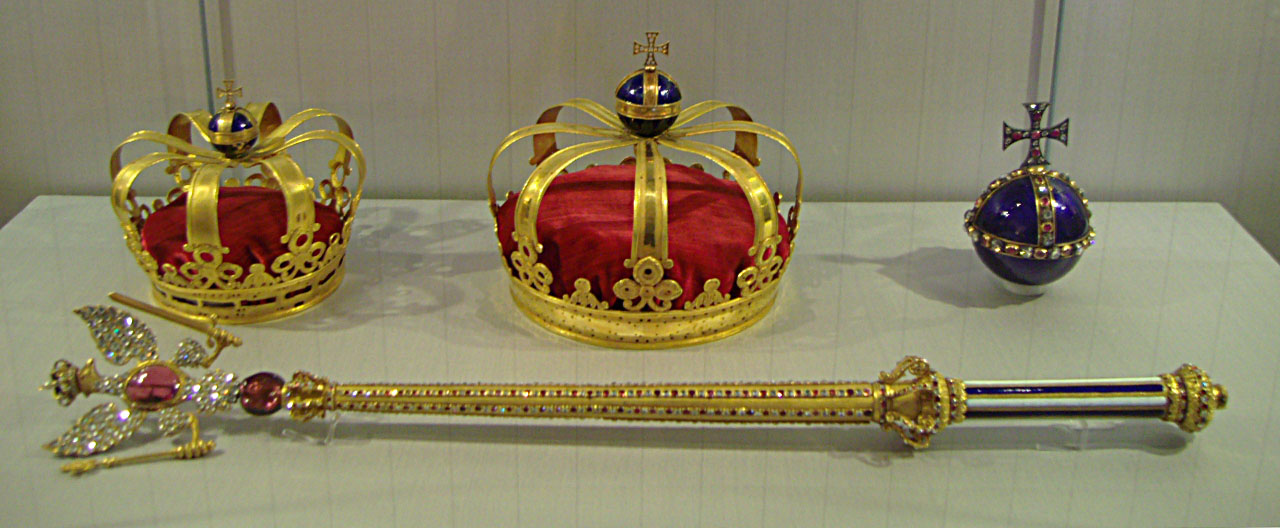
Prussian Crown Jewels, Charlottenburg Palace

The Prussian Crown Jewels (German: Preußischen Kronjuwelen) are the royal regalia, consisting of two crowns, an orb and a sceptre, used during the coronation of the monarchs of Prussia from the House of Hohenzollern. After the King of Prussia became German Emperor on the establishment of the German Empire on 18 January 1871, they were no longer used as the position of King of Prussia while still remaining, was a title of lesser importance compared to the new role as German Emperor. There was no actual crown for the German Empire, although a heraldic version existed.

The Prussian Crown Jewels remain the private property of the House of Hohenzollern, whose current head is Georg Friedrich Prinz von Preussen, who is Kaiser Wilhelm II's great-great-grandson.

== Regalia ==
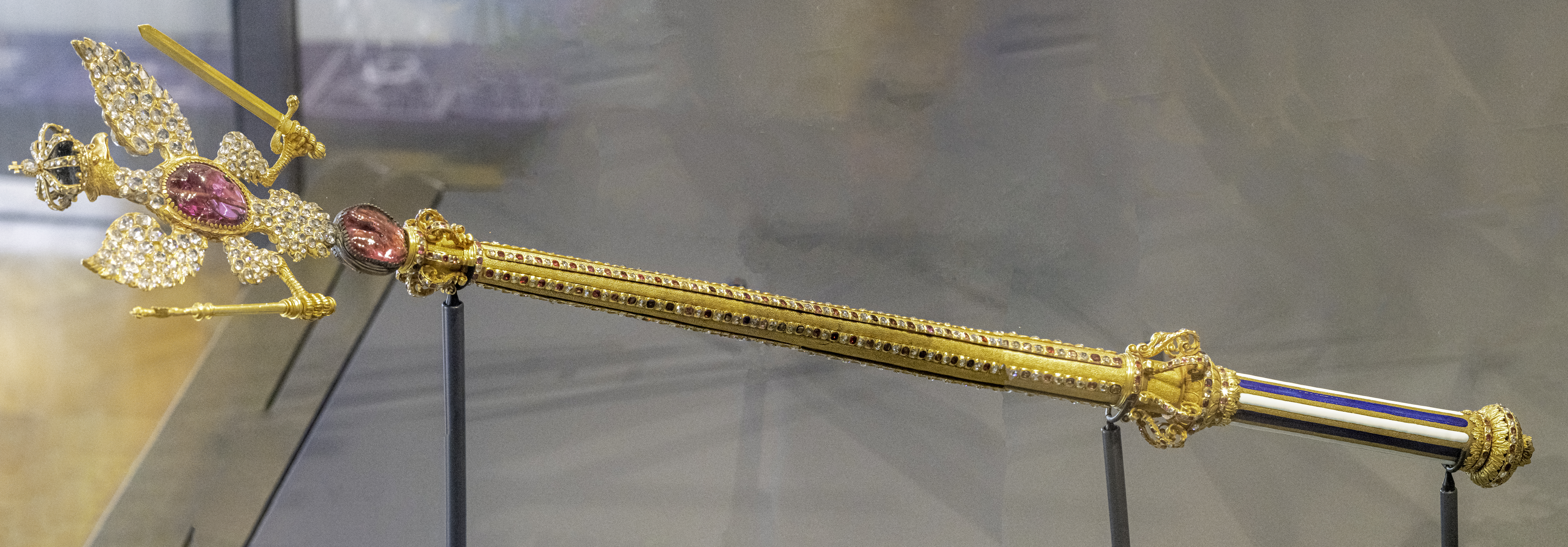
Scepter of King Frederick I

The regalia includes:

- Crown of William II (1889), or the Hohenzollern Crown, is the only piece dating from the imperial period, but is very similar to older crowns.

In the absence of further state regalia for the German Empire (1871–1918), the older royal Prussian Crown Jewels were sometimes also regarded as the German Crown Jewels:

- Crown of Frederick I (1701)
- Crown of Queen Sophie Charlotte (1701)
- Royal Sceptre of Frederick I (1701)
- Royal Orb of King Frederick I (1701)

Prussia became a part of the German Empire in 1871 and its King also became the German Emperor (Kaiser). The German Empire became a republic in 1918 and, at the same time, Prussia became part of the federal republic.

Most of the Prussian regalia are on public display in the Charlottenburg Palace in Berlin. The Crown of William II, in his role as King of Prussia, is kept at Hohenzollern Castle near Hechingen in Baden-Württemberg.
