= Fassini =

Fassini is a surname. Notable people with the surname include:

- Alberto Fassini (1875–1942), Italian business tycoon and film producer
- Tancredi Fassini (1900–1943), Italian ice hockey player
