= Tancrède (disambiguation) =

Tancrède is an opera by André Campra.

Tancrède may also refer to:

- Tancrède de Hauteville (980–1041), an eleventh-century Norman petty lord
- Tancrède Dumas (1830–1905), an Italian photographer
- Tancrède Auguste (1856–1913), 20th President of Haiti
- Tancrède Synave (1870–1936), a French painter
- Tancrède Labbé (1887–1956), a prominent Quebec politician and businessman
- Tancrède Vallerey (1892–1974), a French writer
- Tancrède (French singer), a French contemporary singer
- Tancrède Melet (1983–2016), a French slackliner
- Tancrède (tragedy), a play by Voltaire
- Tancrède (1862), a French aviso

== See also ==
- Tancred (name)
- Tancred (disambiguation)
- Tancredi (disambiguation)
- Tancredo (disambiguation)
