= Tancredo =

Tancredo may refer to:

- Tancredo Neves (1910–1985), Brazilian statesman
- Tancredo Pinochet (1879–1957), Chilean intellectual
- Tancredo dos Santos (born 1988), Brazilian politician
- Tom Tancredo (born 1945), American politician

== See also ==
- Don Tancredo, a bullfighting technique
- Tancred
- Tancredi (disambiguation)
