= Tancredi (disambiguation) =

Tancredi is an 1813 opera by the composer Gioachino Rossini.

Tancredi may also refer to:

== People ==
- Tancred Tancredi (c. 1185–9 to 1241), also called Tancred of Siena, an Italian ecclesiastic, missionary, and one of the first generation of Dominican friars
- Tancredi Fassini (1900–1943), Italian ice hockey player
- Tancredi Palamara (born 1968), Italian rock guitarist, known professionally as Tank Palamara
- Tancredi Pasero (1893–1983), an Italian bass singer
- Filippo Tancredi (1655–1722), an Italian painter
- Franco Tancredi (born 1955), retired professional Italian goalkeeper
- Gonzalo Tancredi (born 1963), an Uruguayan astronomer
- Melissa Tancredi (born 1981), Canadian soccer forward
- Roberto Tancredi (born 1944), retired Italian professional goalkeeper

== Fictional characters ==
- Tancredi, a character in the Italian epic poem Jerusalem Delivered (La Gerusalemme liberata) 1581, by Torquato Tasso
- Tancredi Falconieri, a character in the novel The Leopard by Giuseppe Tomasi di Lampedusa
- Sara Tancredi, from the American television series, Prison Break, played by Sarah Wayne Callies
- Frank Tancredi, the father of Sara in the American television series, Prison Break

== Other uses ==
- 5088 Tancredi, main-belt asteroid
- Gesta Tancredi, narrative of the First Crusade
- Il combattimento di Tancredi e Clorinda, musical work by Claudio Monteverdi, based on Tasso

== See also ==
- Tancred (name)
- Tancred (disambiguation)
- Tancrède (disambiguation)
