= Crown of Frederick I of Prussia =

Royal headwear

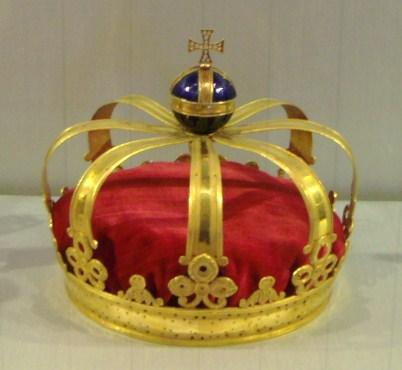

Details
- Country: Kingdom of Prussia
- Made: 1701
- Arches: 8
- Material: Gold
- Cap: Red velvet
- Notable stones: Diamonds, pearls
- Predecessors: None (Kingdom established)
- Successors: Crown of Wilhelm II

The Crown of Frederick I (German: Krone von Friedrich I.) was made by the Court Jewellers for Frederick I of Prussia in 1701, who crowned himself and his wife Sophie Charlotte in a baroque ceremony at Königsberg Castle, Königsberg. The crown was also used for the coronation of Frederick William I and his son, Frederick II (better known as Frederick the Great). He was a very frugal monarch, and although the crown was present at his coronation, he did not wear it.

The crown along with most of the Prussian royal regalia is kept at Charlottenburg Palace.

== See also ==
- Prussian Crown Jewels
