= Don Tancredo =

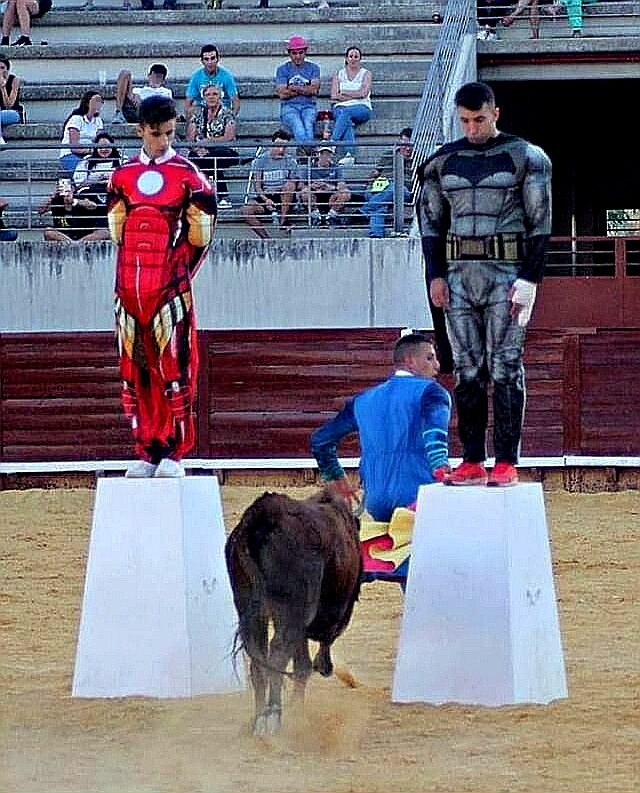
People doing Don Tancredo in Casar de Cáceres bullring.

Don Tancredo was a bullfighting technique which was popular in the first half of 20th century. It consisted of a person, who plays the part of Don Tancredo, who waits for the bull whilst standing on a pedestal located in the middle of the bullring. The performer was dressed in period or comic costume and was painted completely white. He had to remain quiet in order to (supposedly) make the bull believe the person was a statue and therefore not attack him because of fear of the hardness of marble.

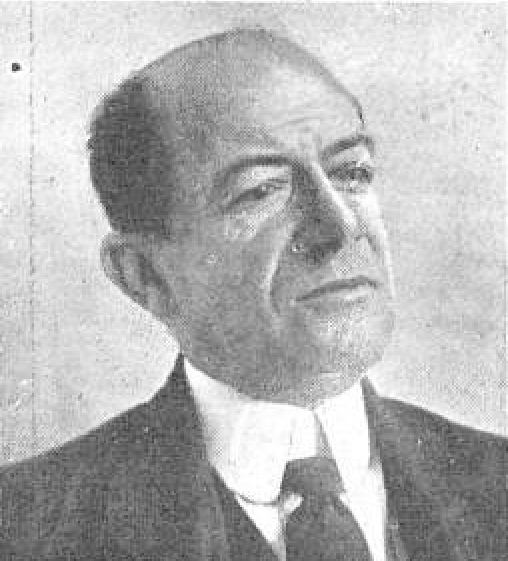
Portrait of Tancredo López

The origin of this practice is uncertain, although there are several sources that affirm that a Spanish bullfighter of little fortune named Tancredo López began this show as a desperate attempt to gain money in the late 19th century. The public received it well, and little by little it spread. Normally the Tancredo was played by desperate people who need to make easy money and who had little to lose, since the catches that took place were numerous. Consequently, the Tancredo was banned by the authorities, and in the middle of 20th century the last representations were made.

One of the most popular appearances of Don Tancredo is interpreted by the Spanish actor Fernando Fernán Gómez in the film El inquilino.
