= Keity Souza Santos =

Immunologist

- Occupation: Immunologist
- Employer: University of São Paulo
- Awards: São Paulo Research Foundation's Young Investigator Award

Keity Souza Santos is an immunologist working at the allergy and immunology department of the University of São Paulo's school of medicine. Santos stated that she was the first person in her family to express interest in science as a career. She was inspired to become a biologist by the story of Dolly the sheep, the first mammal clone. She received her bachelor's degree in Biological Sciences from the University of São Paulo in 2003, and her doctorate in Allergy and Immunopathology in 2008 from the same institution. During her doctorate, she worked to find an anti-venom for the sting of Apis mellifera, which is also called the "Africanized honeybee." She did post-doctoral work in Salzburg, in Austria, and at Cornell University in Ithaca, in the USA. Her later work has been on identifying venom proteins in various insect stings, and in some cases, identifying the damage that they cause to tissues in the human body.

Santos is an international member of the American Academy of Allergy, Asthma & Immunology.

Santos was expected to give birth to twins in 2013.

Santos was awarded the Young Investigator Award by the São Paulo Research Foundation.
