= Crown of Wilhelm II =

1888 crown made for German Emperor Wilhelm II

Hohenzollern crown
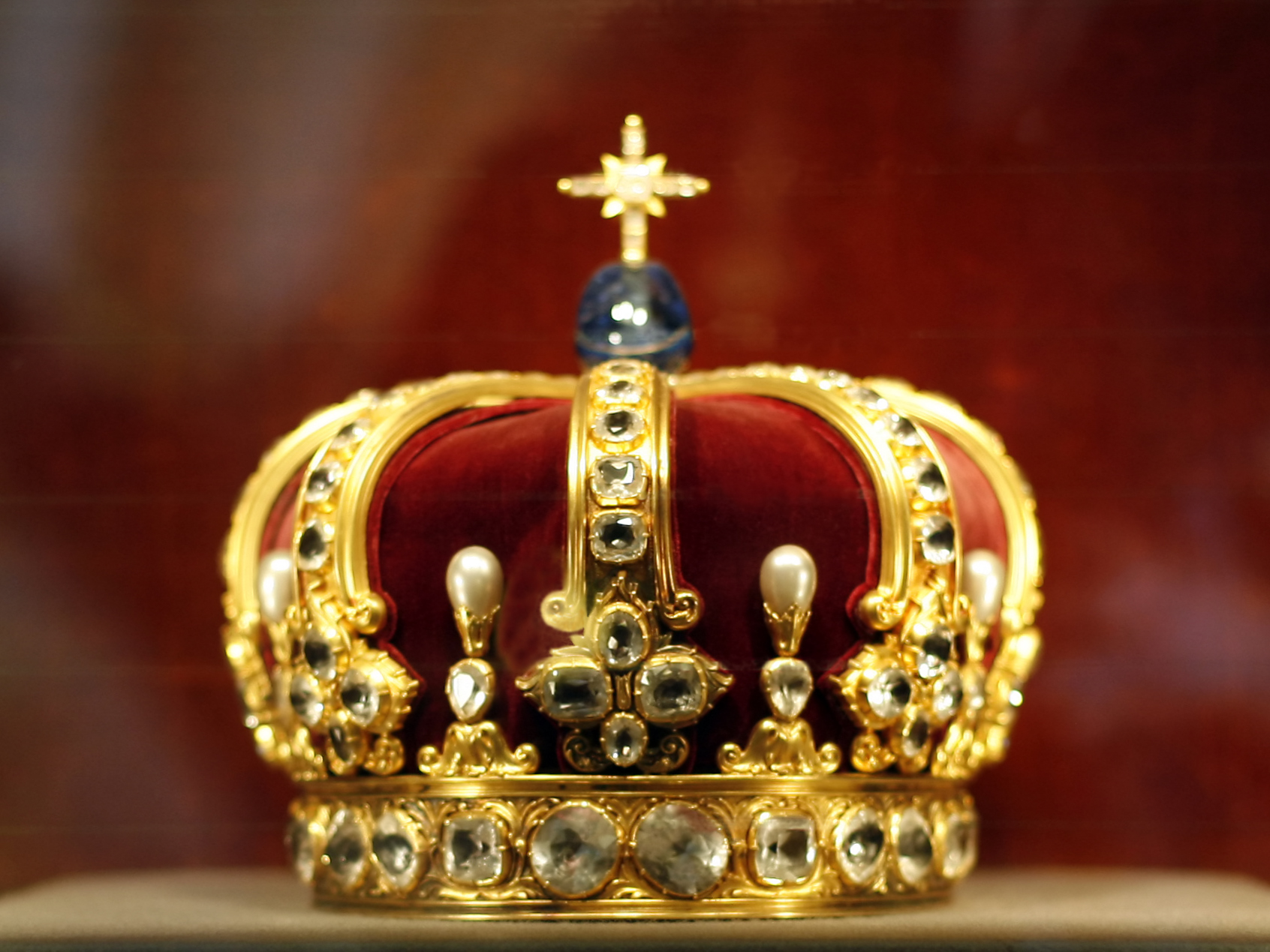

Heraldic depictions

Details
- Country: Germany
- Made: 1889
- Arches: 8
- Material: Gold
- Cap: Red
- Notable stones: 160 diamonds 8 pearls 1 sapphire
- Predecessors: Crown of Frederick I of Prussia
- Successors: None (monarchy abolished)

The Crown of Wilhelm II (German: Krone von Wilhelm II), also known as the Hohenzollern Crown (Hohenzollernkrone), is the 1889 crown made for Wilhelm II, German Emperor, in his role as King of Prussia.

The crown is surmounted by a diamond-studded cross which rests on a large sapphire. These rest on eight half-arches rising from the base that are adorned with 142 rose-cut diamonds and 18 diamonds. Eight large pearls are mounted between the arches.

The crown was ordered via a decree on the 27th of February, 1889. It was realized by Hugo Schaper.

When Wilhelm abdicated in 1918 he was permitted to retain the jewels, which included the Hohenzollern crown. To protect it from theft and destruction during World War II, it was hidden in a wall in the crypt of a church. After the war it was returned to the Hohenzollern family and is now kept at the family residence of the Hohenzollern Castle.

== See also ==
- Prussian Crown Jewels
