= Coronations in Europe =

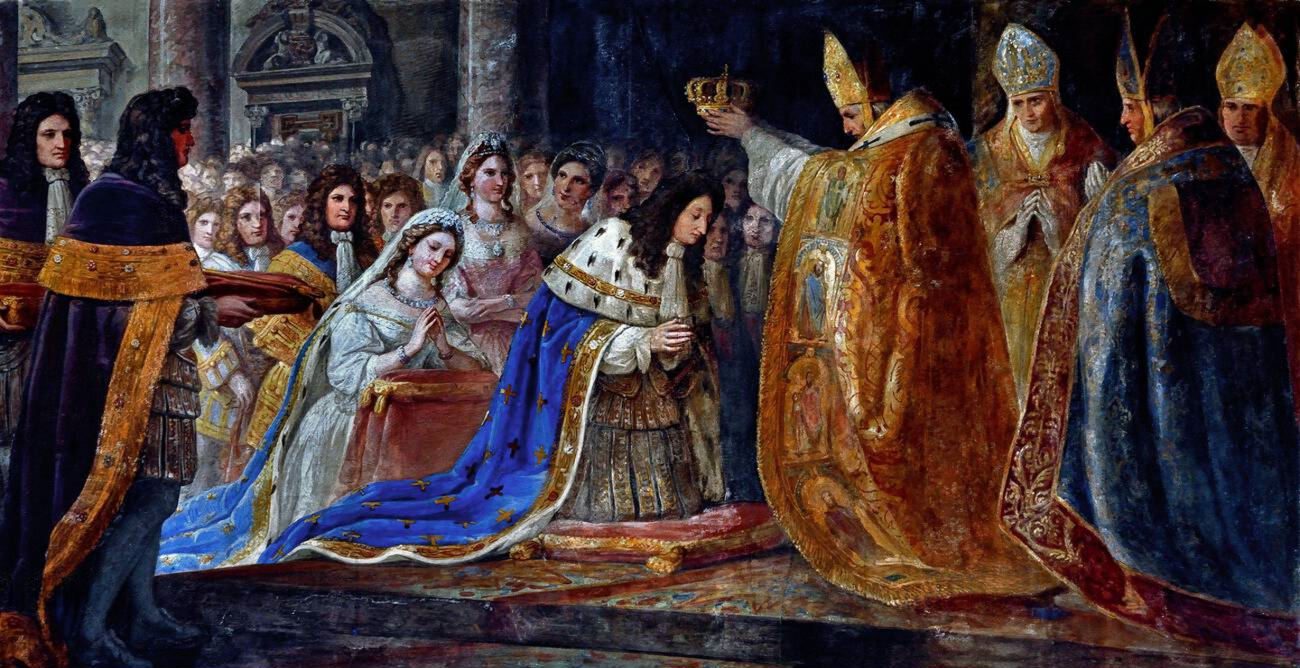
Coronation of Duke Victor Amadeus II to King of Sardinia in 1720

Coronations were previously held in the monarchies of Europe. The United Kingdom is the only monarchy in Europe that still practises coronations. Other European monarchies either have replaced coronations with simpler ceremonies to mark an accession (e.g. Norway and Denmark) or have never practised them (e.g. The Netherlands and Belgium). Most monarchies today only require a simple oath to be taken in the presence of the country's legislature.

== By country ==
=== Albania ===
King Zog I, self-proclaimed monarch of Albania, was ritually crowned on 1 September 1928. His coronation attire included rose-colored breeches, gold spurs, and a gold crown weighing seven pounds ten ounces (3.5 kg). Europe's only Muslim king swore a required constitutional oath on the Bible and the Qur'an, symbolizing his desire to unify his country. Zog was forced into exile by Italian invaders in 1939, and the monarchy was formally abolished in 1945.

=== Austria ===
Emperors of Austria were never crowned (unlike their predecessors in the Holy Roman Empire), as a coronation was not viewed as being necessary to legitimize their rule in that country.

However, they were crowned in some of the kingdoms within the Austrian Empire. Ferdinand I was crowned as King of Hungary with the Crown of Saint Stephen in 1830, as King of Bohemia with the Crown of Saint Wenceslas in 1836, and as King of Lombardy and Venetia with the Iron Crown of Lombardy in 1838.

After the Austro-Hungarian Compromise of 1867, the Emperors of Austria were only crowned as King of Hungary (again with the Crown of Saint Stephen): Franz-Joseph I in 1867 and Charles I (as Charles IV of Hungary) in 1916.

=== Belgium ===
Following the Belgian Revolution from 1830 to 1831 and the subsequent establishment of an independent Kingdom of Belgium from the United Kingdom of the Netherlands, Leopold I and his successors have never been crowned in a coronation rite. Belgium has no regalia such as crowns (except as a heraldic emblem); the monarch's formal installation requires only a solemn oath to "abide by the Constitution and the laws of the Belgian people, maintain the country’s independence and preserve its territory" before members of the two chambers of parliament.

During the enthronement of Baudouin, one legislator, Julien Lahaut, cried "Vive la République", only to be shouted down by others, who cried "Vive le Roi", with the entire chamber rising to applaud the King. Lahaut was found dead a week later. During the enthronement of Albert II, one legislator, Jean-Pierre Van Rossem, cried "Leve de republiek, Vive la république européenne, Vive Lahaut!" Van Rossem was also shouted down by the others, but did not suffer the same fate as Lahaut.

=== Bohemia ===
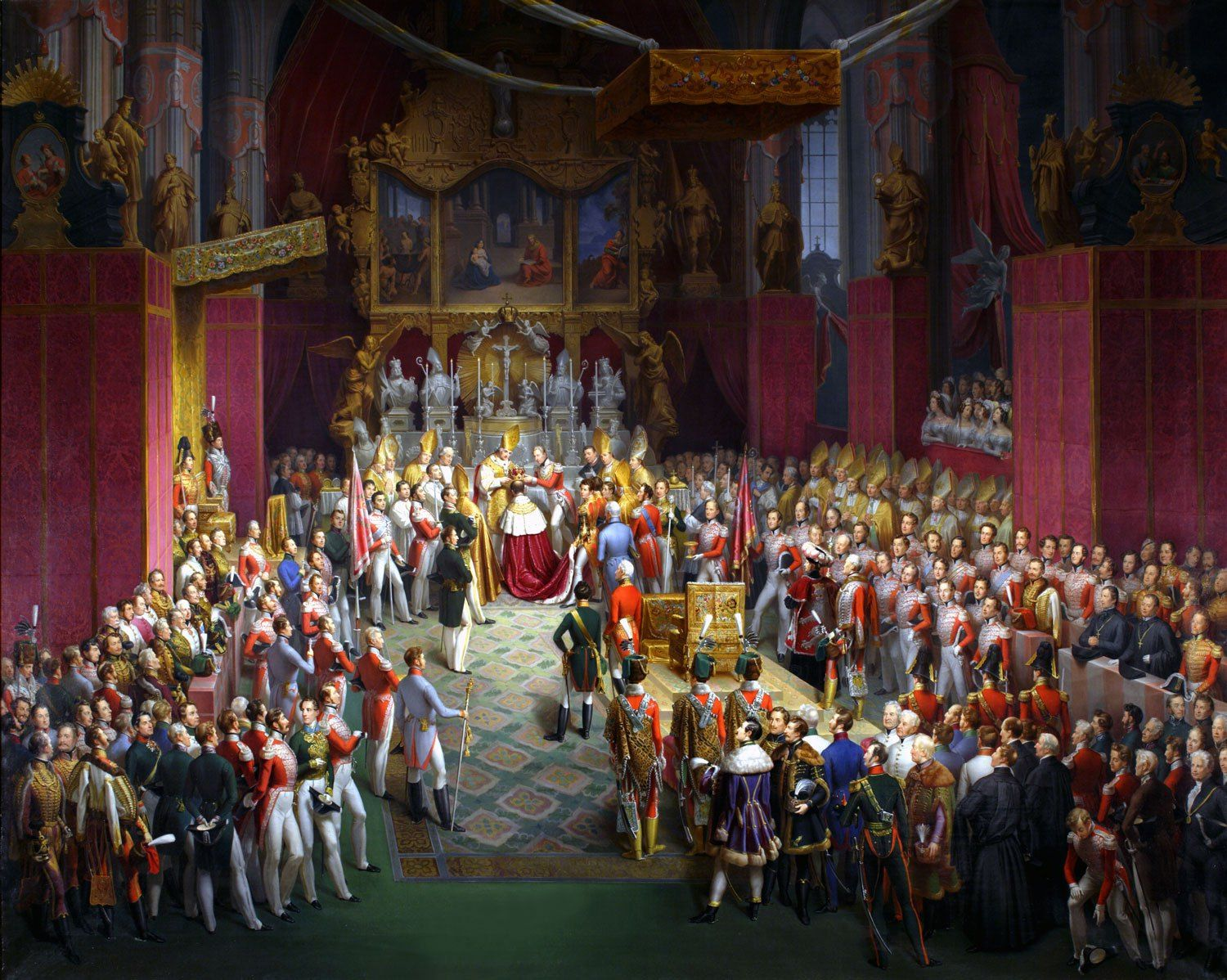
Coronation of King Ferdinand V of Bohemia in 1836

Vratislaus II of Bohemia was the first crowned ruler of Bohemia. During the Middle Ages, it was held that enthronement would make a person Duke of Bohemia and that only coronation would make a person King of Bohemia. St. Vitus Cathedral was the coronation church. Monarchs of Bohemia were crowned with the Crown of Saint Wenceslas and invested with royal insignia, among which a cap or mitre and a lance (symbols of Saint Wenceslas) were specific for Bohemian coronations.

Maria Theresa, the only female monarch of Bohemia, was crowned king in order to emphasize that she was the monarch and not consort. The last King of Bohemia to be crowned as such was Emperor Ferdinand of Austria.

The abbess of the St. George's Abbey had the privilege to crown the wife of the King of Bohemia. In 1791, the right to crown the Queen of Bohemia was transferred to the Abbess of the Damenstift or Theresian Institution of Noble Ladies (a post always filled by an Archduchess of Austria).

=== Bosnia ===
The first crowned ruler of Bosnia was Tvrtko I. His coronation, held on 26 October 1377, created the Kingdom of Bosnia. It was traditionally held that Stephen Tvrtko I was crowned in the Mileševo monastery by its metropolitan bishop, but it has been proposed that he was crowned in the monastery of Mile, where most Bosnian coronations were held, with a crown sent by King Louis I of Hungary. Tvrtko I's coronation served as an example for subsequent such rites.

The details of the Bosnian coronation ceremony are unclear. The Catholic Church, the Bosnian Church and the Eastern Orthodox Church competed in Bosnia, and it is not even known which church's officials performed the coronation. The Bosnian Church is considered least likely to have led the ceremony, as its elders frowned upon such rituals. The liturgical aspect of the ceremony was important, but not primary. A specific crown was revered and deemed indispensable for a proper coronation. Dethroned rulers had to undergo another coronation upon restoration to the throne. The coronation was sometimes delayed, but monarchs could exercise full authority immediately after their election.

The last coronation in Bosnia was held in St. Mary's Church in Jajce, November 1461. Although all kings of Bosnia were at least formally Roman Catholic, only the last king, Stephen Tomašević, was crowned with the Pope's approval and with a crown sent by Pope Pius II. The coronation was performed by the papal legate.

=== Bulgaria ===
The rulers of the Second Bulgarian Empire were crowned in the same manner as Byzantine emperors, while the manner of coronation of the rulers of the First Bulgarian Empire remains unknown. Modern Bulgaria was a monarchy from its independence in 1878 until 1946. The modern hereditary Bulgarian kings were pronounced heads of state by the Parliament and anointed at the Alexander Nevsky Cathedral in Sofia, but did not have the formal coronation ritual known in western countries.

=== Byzantine Empire ===
Building on the largely impromptu and informal acclamation of the Roman emperors, the Byzantine Empire gradually developed a complex coronation ritual. Initially taking place in public at the Hippodrome of Constantinople, by the 7th century coronations took place in a church, most often the Hagia Sophia cathedral, with the Patriarch of Constantinople playing a significant role in the ceremony. The ceremony became standardized thereafter, with minor changes during the remainder of the Empire's history. Byzantine practice was emulated elsewhere, notably by the Bulgarian, Serbian, and Russian monarchs.

=== Croatia ===
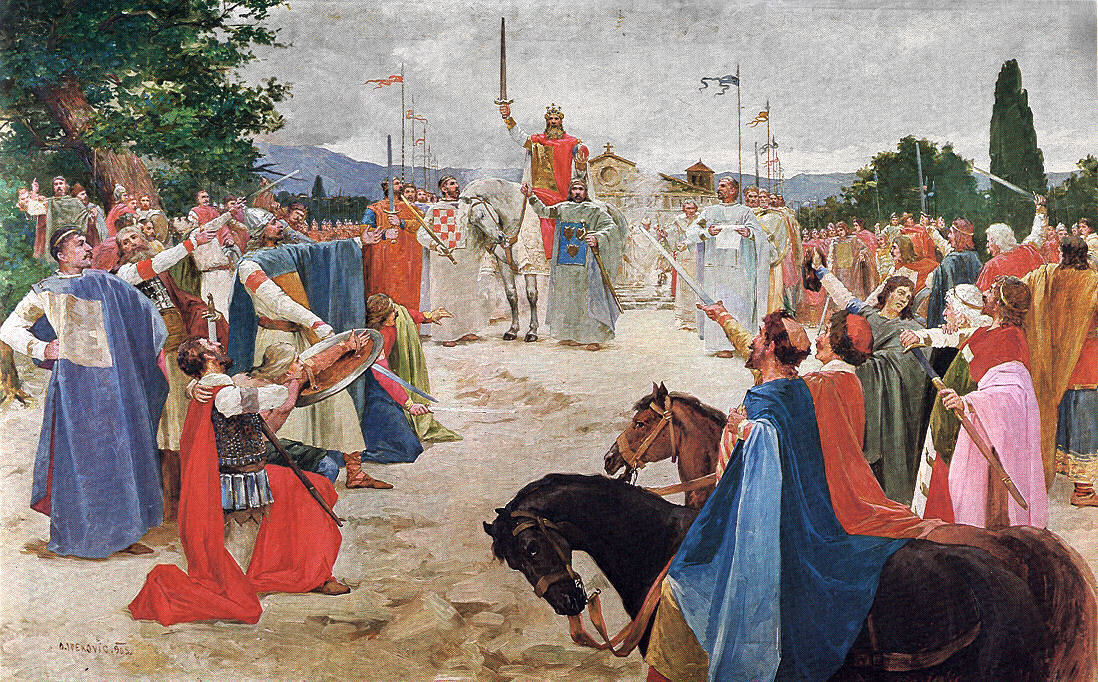
Artwork representing the coronation of King Tomislav of Croatia.

The Trpimirović dynasty was a native Croatian dynasty that ruled in the Duchy and later the Kingdom of Croatia from 845 until 1091, with interruptions by the Domagojević dynasty.

The first monarch of Croatia was King Tomislav, crowned in 925. A note in the proceedings of the 925 Council of Split calls Tomislav king "in the province of the Croats and in the Dalmatian regions" (in prouintia Croatorum et Dalmatiarum finibus Tamisclao rege), and in the council's 12th canon, the ruler of the Croats is called "king" (rex et proceres Chroatorum). In a letter from Pope John X, Tomislav is called "King of the Croats" (Tamisclao, regi Crouatorum). Letters in which Tomislav was called king were preserved in a version of Thomas the Archdeacon's 13th-century History of Salona.

Older historiography assumed that Tomislav was crowned in a field at Duvno (near Tomislavgrad), although there are no contemporary records. This conclusion was probably drawn from the Chronicle of the Priest of Duklja, which describes a coronation of King Svatopluk (Budimir in a later version of the chronicle) and a council held in a field at Dalma. Some historians theorized that Tomislav and Svatopluk were the same person, or the author was mistaken about the king's name.

Prominent rulers of the Trpimirović Dynasty include Tomislav, Petar Krešimir IV and Demetrius Zvonimir. The house included four dukes, thirteen kings and a queen consort.

In 1091 the last member of the House of Trpimirović, Stephen II, died without leaving an heir. In 1093 the Croatian nobility chose Petar Snačić as King of Croatia. Petar Snačić fought the war against the invasion of the Hungarian King, and died in the Battle of Gvozd Mountain in 1097. This led to a personal union of Croatia and Hungary in 1102. In practice, Croatia was ruled by a Ban (a viceroy) who was commonly from a Croatian noble house. It was agreed that every King of Hungary would come to Croatia for a separate coronation as King of Croatia. The last king to be crowned in Croatia was King Andrew II of Hungary. His son, King Béla IV, refused to be crowned in Croatia in 1235, and the custom afterward died out. Some scholars claim Béla IV's father was never crowned as King of Croatia either.

In 1941, Aimone, 4th Duke of Aosta, was installed as King by fascist Italy. No coronation was ever held.

=== Denmark ===
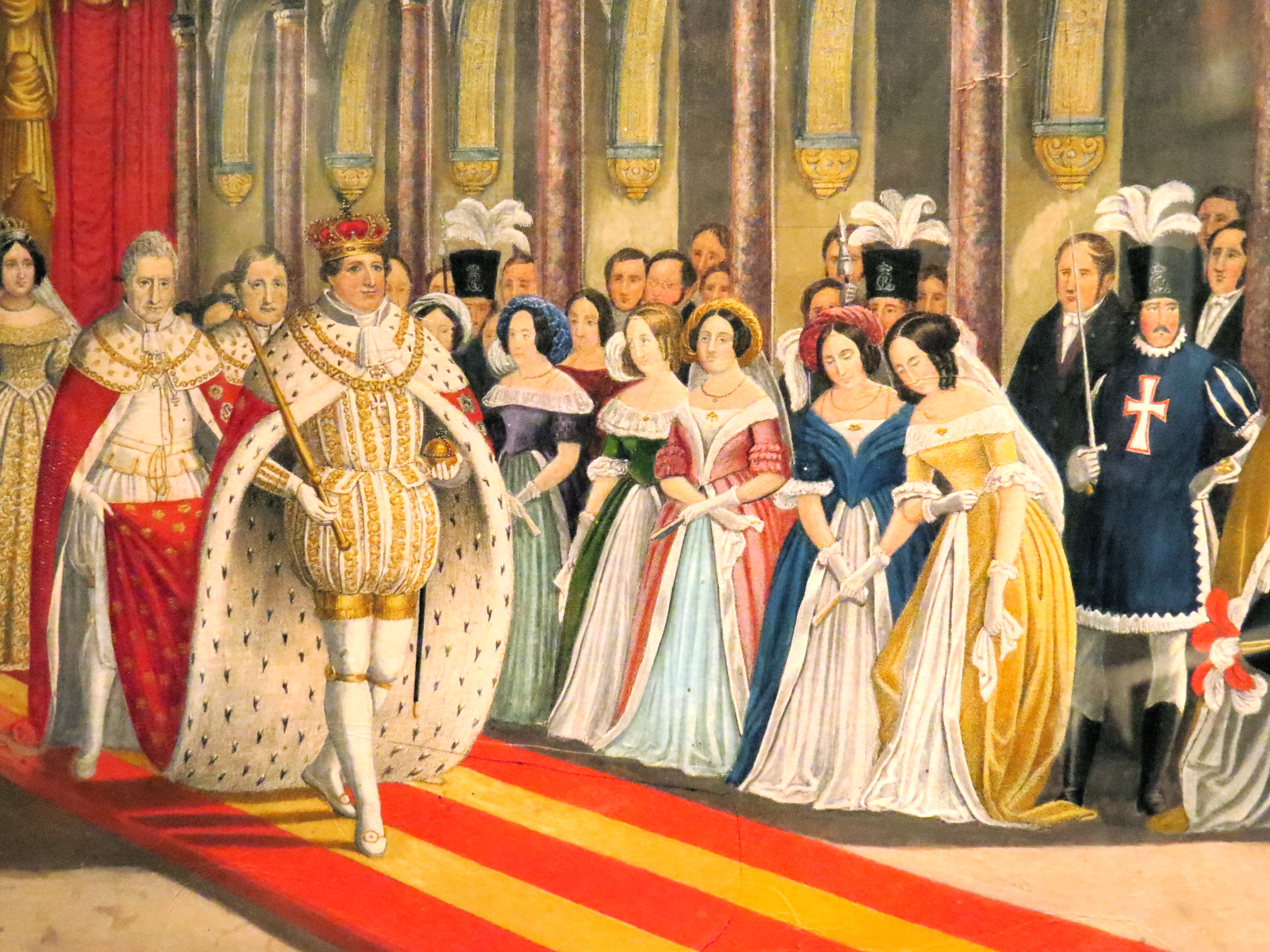
Coronation of Christian VIII of Denmark, from a contemporary engraving, 1840.

Danish enthronements may be divided into three distinct types of rituals: the medieval coronation, which existed during the period of elective monarchy; the anointing ritual, which replaced coronation with the introduction of absolute monarchy in 1660; and finally the simple proclamation, which has been used since the introduction of the Danish Constitution in 1849.

The coronation ritual (as of 1537) began with a procession of the ruler and his consort into St. Mary's Cathedral in Copenhagen, followed by the Danish crown jewels. The monarch was seated before the altar, where he swore to govern justly, preserve the Lutheran religion, support schools, and help the poor. Following this, the king was anointed on the lower right arm and between the shoulders, but not on the head. Then the royal couple retired to a tented enclosure where they were robed in royal attire, returning to hear a sermon, the Kyrie and Gloria, and then a prayer and the Epistle reading.

Following the Epistle, the king knelt before the altar, where he was first given a sword. After flourishing and sheathing it, the still-kneeling monarch was crowned by the clergy and nobility, who jointly placed the diadem upon their ruler's head. The scepter and orb were presented, and then returned to attendants. The queen was anointed and crowned in a similar manner, but she received only a scepter and not an orb. A choral hymn was then sung, and then the newly crowned king and queen listened to a second sermon and the reading of the Gospel, which brought the service to an end.

In 1660 the coronation ritual was replaced with a ceremony of anointing: the new king would arrive at the coronation site already wearing the crown, and he was then anointed. This rite was in turn abolished with the introduction of the Danish Constitution in 1849. Today the crown of Denmark is only displayed at the monarch's funeral, when it lies on top of their coffin. The former Queen, Margrethe II, and her son, the present king, Frederik X, did not have any formal enthronement service; a public announcement of the accession was made from the balcony of Christiansborg Palace, with the new sovereign being acclaimed by the Prime Minister at the time, then cheered with a ninefold "hurrah" by the crowds below.

=== France ===
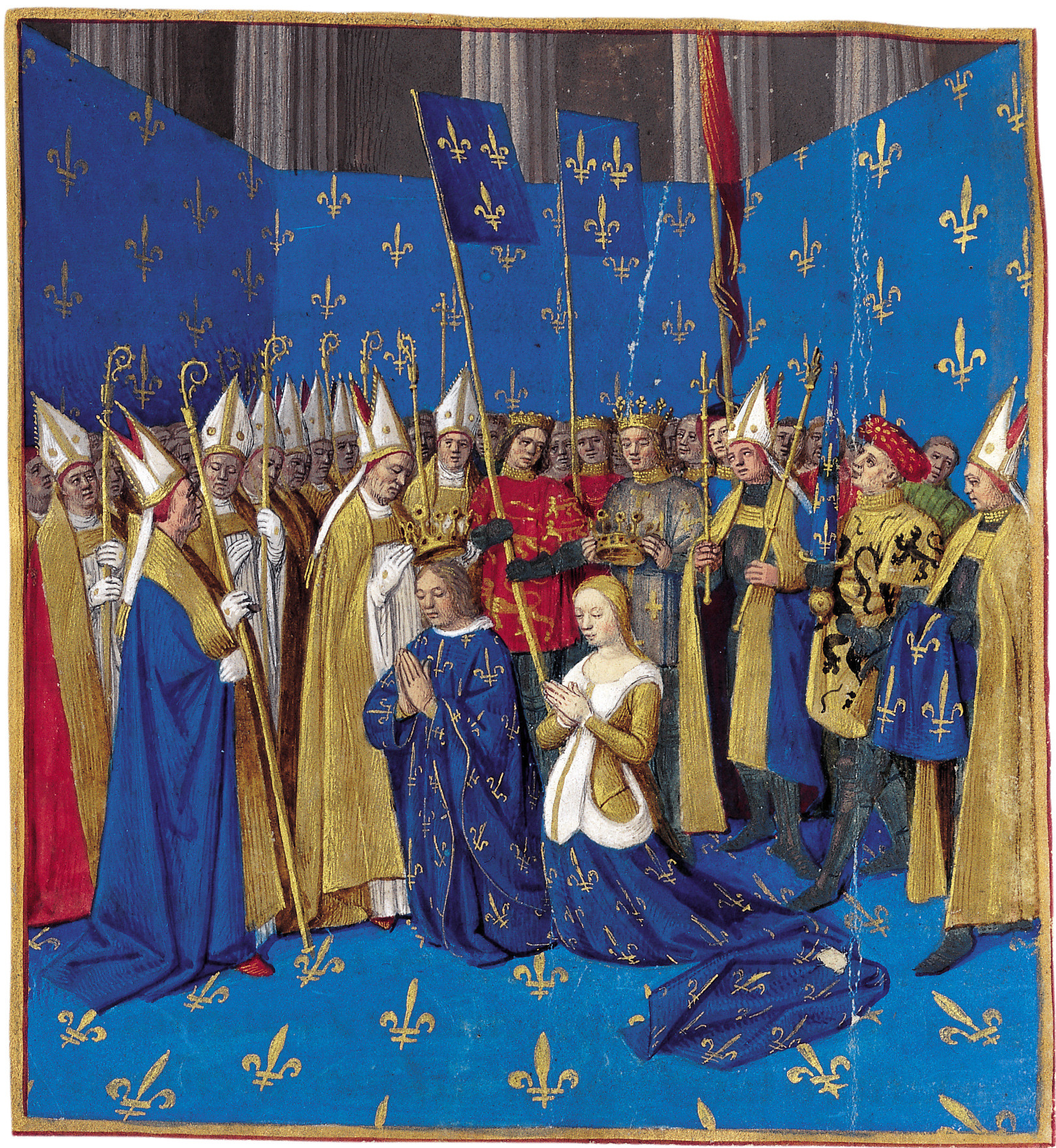
Coronation of Louis VIII of France and Blanche of Castile at Reims in 1223; a miniature from the Grandes Chroniques de France, circa 1450.

Following perhaps the Byzantine or Visigothic formula, the French coronation ceremony called Sacre primarily included the anointing or unction of the king. It was first held in Soissons in 752 for the Carolingian king Pepin the Short to legitimise his deposition of the last of the Merovingian kings, who had been elected by an assembly of nobles inside the royal family and according to hereditary rules. A second coronation of Pepin by Pope Stephen II took place at the Basilica of St Denis in 754; this is the first recorded by a Pope. The unction served as a reminder of the baptism of king Clovis I in Reims by archbishop Saint Remi in 496/499, where the ceremony was finally transferred in 816 and completed with the use of the Holy Ampulla found in 869 in the grave of the saint. Since this Roman glass vial, containing the balm due to be mixed with chrism, was allegedly brought by the dove of the Holy Spirit, the French monarchs claimed to receive their power by divine right. The French coronation ritual was similar to that used in England, from 925 and above all 1066, with the coronation of William the Conqueror. The last royal coronation was that of Charles X, in 1825. Heirs to the French throne were also sometimes crowned during their predecessors' reigns during the Middle Ages, but this was discontinued as laws of primogeniture became stronger. The coronation regalia, like the throne and sceptre of Dagobert I or crown and sword of Charlemagne, were kept in the Basilica of Saint-Denis near Paris, and the liturgical instruments, like the Holy Ampulla and Chalice, in Reims, where they are still partly preserved as well as in the Louvre and other Parisian museums.

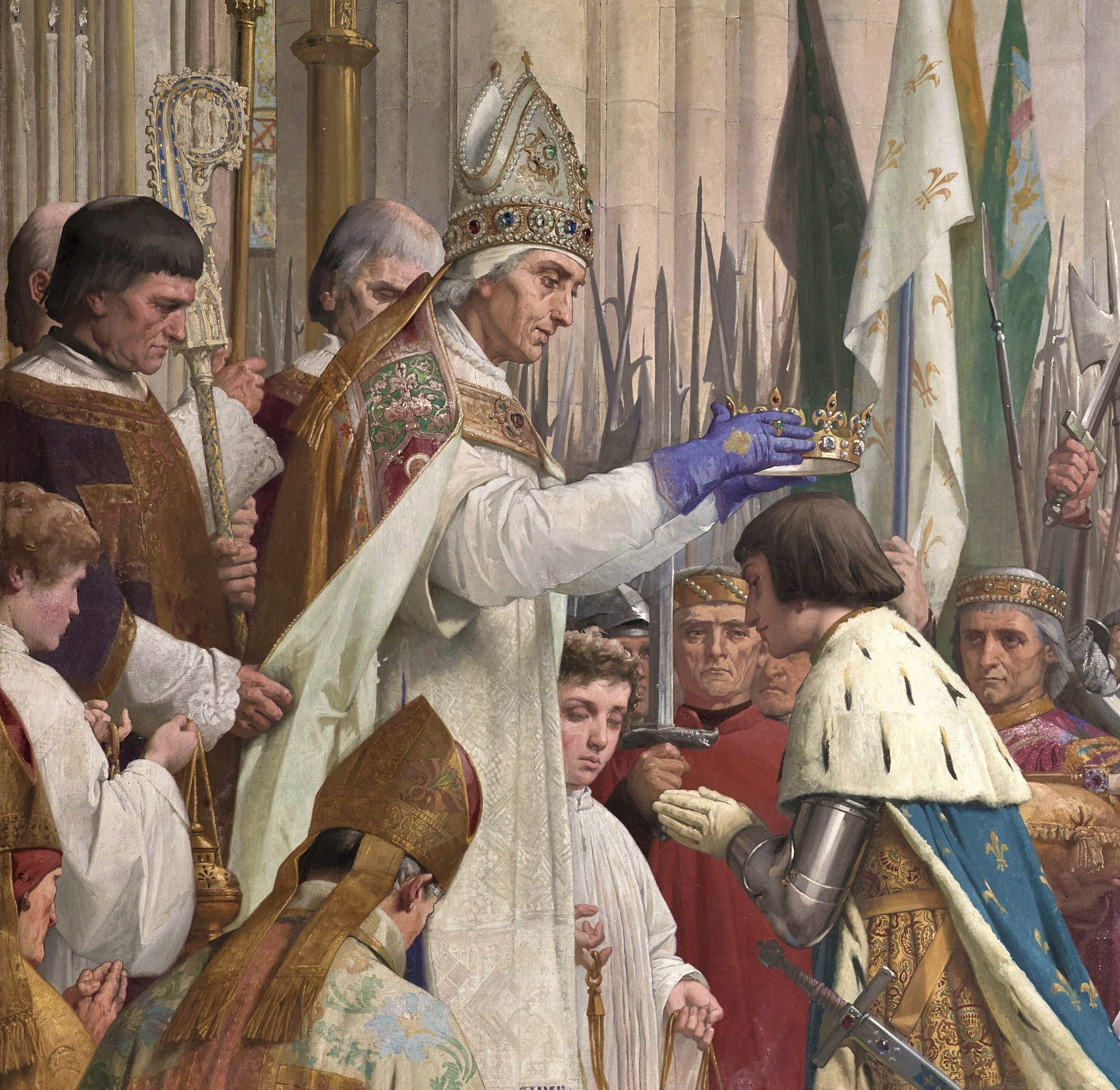
The coronation of Charles VII of France

During the First French Empire, Emperor Napoleon I and Empress Josephine were crowned in December 1804 in an extremely elaborate ritual presided over by Pope Pius VII and conducted at the Notre Dame Cathedral in Paris. Napoleon III chose not to be crowned. The French republican government broke up and sold off most of the Crown Jewels, in the hope of avoiding any public sentiment for a restoration of the monarchy after the collapse of the Second French Empire in 1871.

=== Germany ===
==== Holy Roman Empire ====
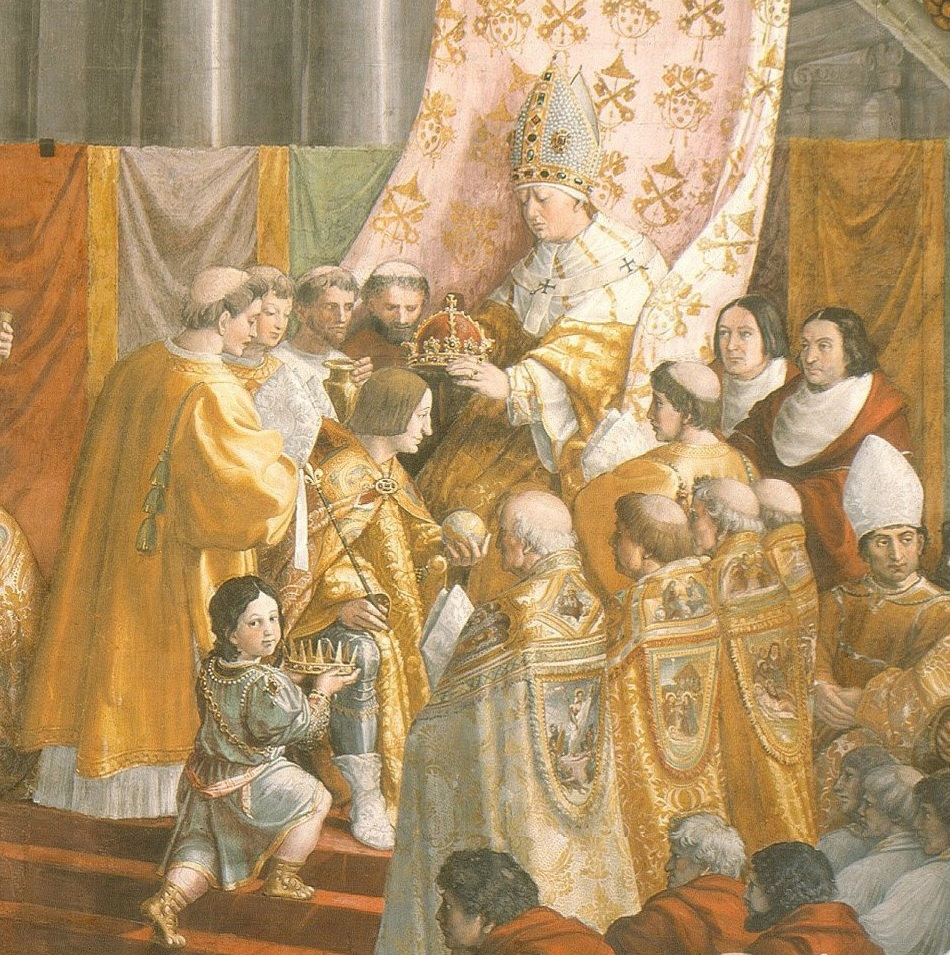
The coronation of Charlemagne by Pope Leo III.

Since Charlemagne in 800, Holy Roman Emperors were crowned by the pope until 1530, when Charles V became the last Holy Roman Emperor to be crowned by the Pope, at Bologna. Thereafter, until the abolition of the empire in 1806, imperial coronations were held in Frankfurt and were performed by the Spiritual Princes-Electors, the Archbishops of Cologne, Mainz and Trier. (Note: See also Guy Stair Sainty, The Holy Roman Empire: Introduction. From the Almanach de la Cour website. Retrieved on 14 September 2008.) Later rulers simply proclaimed themselves Electus Romanorum Imperator or "Elected Emperor of the Romans", without the formality of a coronation by the Pontiff.

Coronations were held in Rome (under the pope), Milan (the Kingdom of Italy), Arles (Burgundy) and Aachen (Germany). Although the Roman ceremony was initially the most important, it was eventually eclipsed by the German ritual. The custom of the emperors going to Rome to be crowned was last observed by Frederick III in 1440; after that, only the German coronation was celebrated.

==== Bavaria ====
In 1806, the German duchy of Bavaria was raised to the status of a "kingdom". The former Duke of Bavaria, who then became King of Bavaria, Maximilian I, commissioned a set of crown jewels to commemorate Bavaria's elevation. However, there was no coronation ceremony, and the king never wore the crown in public. Rather, it was placed on a cushion at his feet when displayed on occasions. The Bavarian monarchy was abolished in 1918.

==== Prussia ====
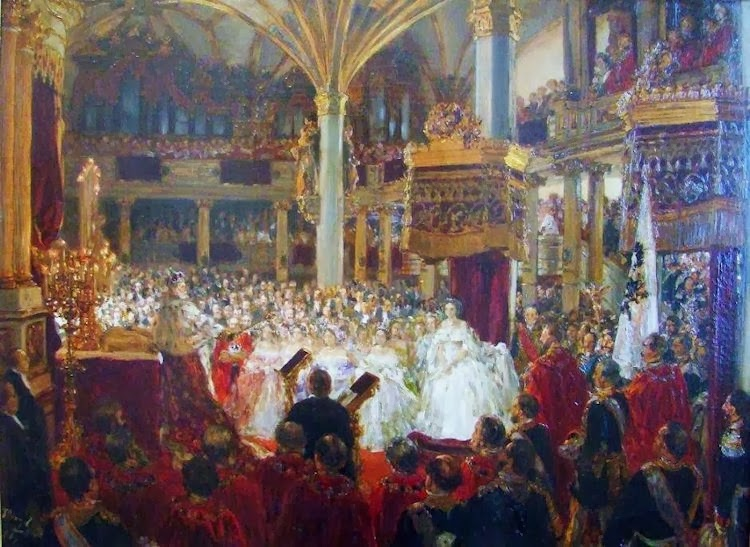
Coronation of King Wilhelm I of Prussia

King Wilhelm I was crowned in 1861 as King of Prussia, prior to the establishment of the German Empire (1871). He was crowned with great pomp, becoming the first king to be crowned in Prussia since the coronation of King Friedrich I in 1701, although a significant number of politicians opposed the idea. Wilhelm I took the crown with his own hands from the altar and crowned himself while saying that he was receiving the crown from God's hands. These words were intended as a warning to Prussian Constitutionalists and Liberals.

Both coronations took place at the church at Königsberg Castle, which had been the last capital of the Ordenstaat and capital of the Duchy of Prussia.

The King of Prussia was also Kaiser of Imperial Germany from 1871 to 1918. Although a design and model for a German State Crown were made, no final diadem was ever produced, and none of the three German emperors were ever formally crowned.

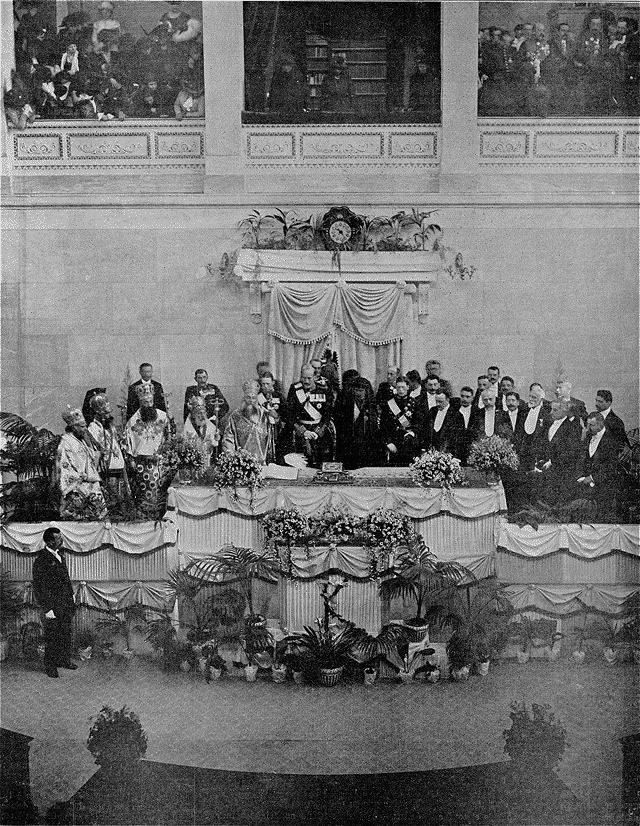
Swearing-in ceremony of Constantine I of Greece

=== Greece ===
Although modern Greece retains a set of crown jewels given to its first king Otto of Greece by his father Ludwig I of Bavaria, no Kings of Greece were ever crowned with them. All monarchs apart from Otto took office by a swearing-in ceremony in front of the Hellenic Parliament until the monarchy was abolished in 1974 by a referendum.

=== Hungary ===
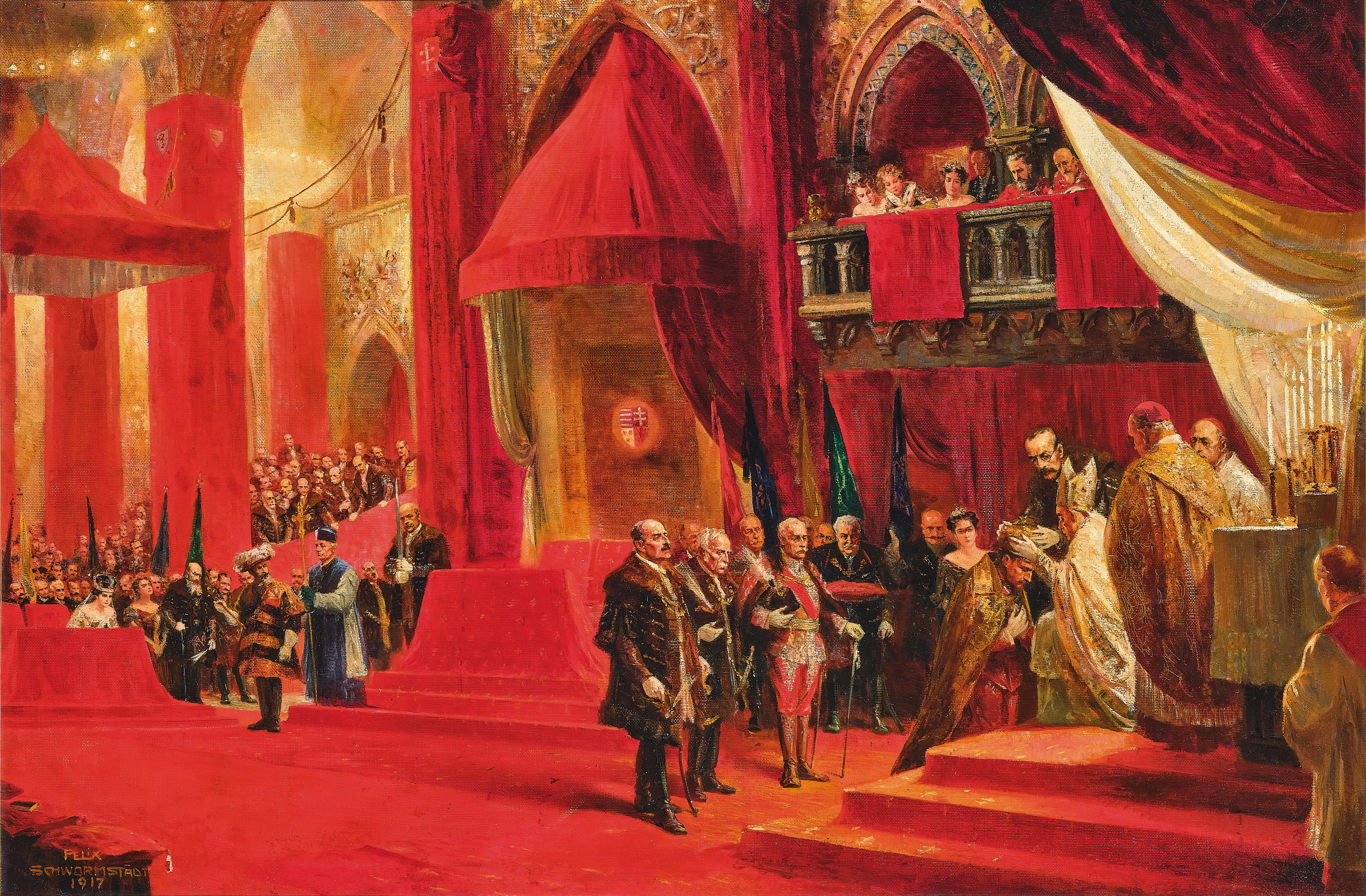
King Charles IV of Hungary at Matthias Church (1916)

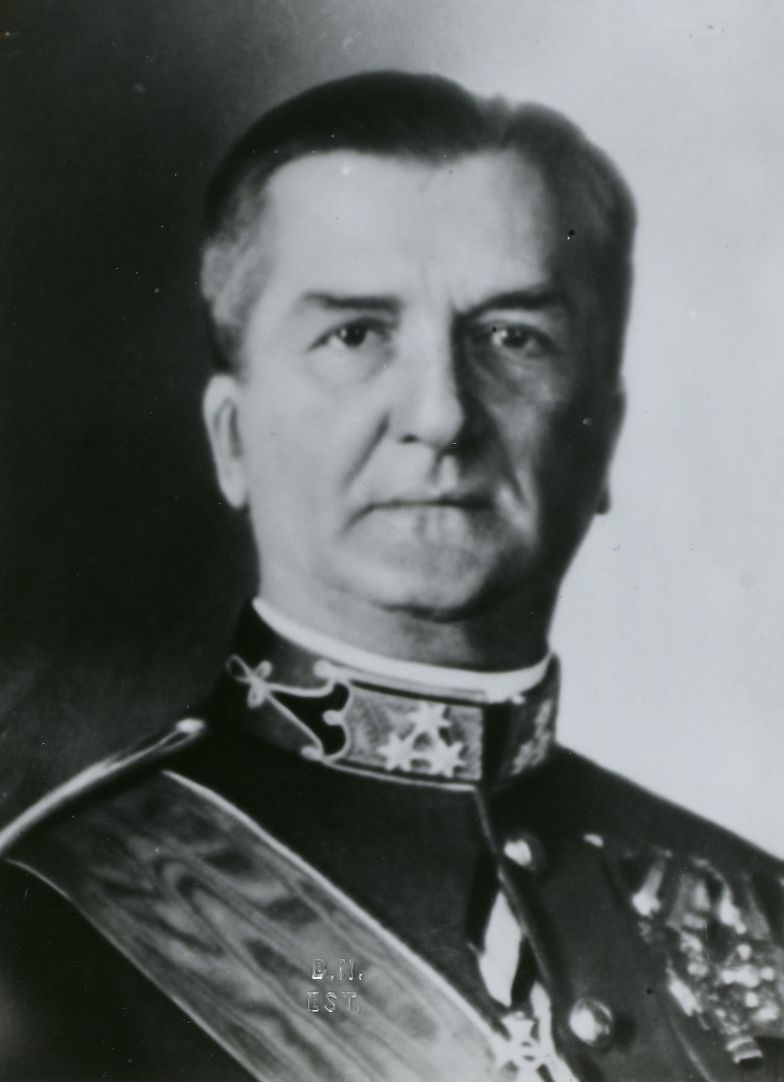
Regent Miklós Horthy

Rulers of Hungary were not considered legitimate monarchs until they were crowned King of Hungary with the Holy Crown of Hungary. As women were not considered fit to rule Hungary, the two queens regnant, Maria I and Maria II Theresa, were crowned kings of Hungary. Hungarian coronations usually took place at Székesfehérvár, the burial place of the first crowned ruler of Hungary, Saint Stephen I, except from 1563 to 1830, when coronations took place in St. Martin's cathedral in Pozsony (now Bratislava), because of Ottoman occupation of Székesfehérvár. The final such rite was held in Budapest on 30 December 1916, when Kaiser Karl I of Austria and Empress Zita were crowned as King Károly IV and Queen Zita of Hungary. The Hungarian monarchy was briefly abolished with the end of the First World War and establishment of the First Hungarian Republic and later Hungarian Soviet Republic, however the nation would later restore a titular monarchy from 1920 to 1946 where Miklós Horthy was appointed Regent. Former King Károly would attempt to reclaim the throne but would fail and be formally barred from resuming the throne. The Monarchy was formally abolished in 1946 following the defeat of the Kingdom of Hungary in World War II however it had already been de facto abolished with the overthrow of Miklós Horthy and establishment of the Government of National Unity.

=== Italy ===
The modern Kingdom of Italy, which existed from 1861 to 1946, did not crown its monarchs.

The Sovereigns of the Holy Roman Empire were crowned Kings of Italy with the famous Iron Crown; also Napoleon was crowned King of Italy in 1805 with this crown.

==== Sicily and Naples ====
As reported by the jurisconsult Tancredus, initially only four monarchs were crowned and anointed: they were the kings of Jerusalem, France, England and Sicily. The coronation was traditionally held in Palermo Cathedral; then with the split of the kingdom there were two coronations, one in Palermo and the other in Naples. The Pope was the only person entitled to crown the monarch of Naples.

The exact coronation customs of the Kings and Queens of Sicily are disputed. According to a Cassino manuscript of c. 1200, the coronation of the kings of Sicily was based on a German model, though variations were made to adapt it to Sicilian tradition.

Several different parts were included in the coronation ceremony. First, the new monarch was asked whether he wished to be the defender of the Church and a just ruler of his kingdom. After that, the people were asked whether they wished to submit themselves to the person who was to be crowned. The king or queen was then anointed on their hands, head, chest, and shoulders. The monarch was then girded with a sword and vested with armillas, pallium, and a ring. The scepter was put in their right hand and the orb in their left hand. Finally, the presiding archbishop placed the crown on the monarch's head.

=== Liechtenstein ===
The sovereign Princes of Liechtenstein have never undergone a coronation or enthronement ceremony, although Prince Hans-Adam II attended a mass celebrated by the Archbishop of Vaduz, followed by a choral display. In 1719 the Liechtenstein family finally attained the long-sought rank of Princes of the Holy Roman Empire and had a crown (or ducal hat, as it is named) made of diamonds, pearls, and rubies. However, as the subsequent princes always resided in Vienna, and until modern times did not even visit their principality, the original princely crown may never have been brought there, and it is now lost. On the occasion of his seventieth birthday, Franz Joseph II, Prince of Liechtenstein, the first monarch of Liechtenstein to dwell in his own realm, was given a princely coronet edged in ermine, a replica of the original, as a gift from his people, which is kept on display in the principality. But it has never been used in a coronation nor worn by a reigning prince. Typical of princely coronets, it lacks "royal" arches, and is surmounted by a tassel instead of a royal orb or cross.

=== Lithuania ===
The Kingdom of Lithuania was a Lithuanian state, which existed roughly from 1251 to 1263. King Mindaugas was the first and only Lithuanian monarch crowned King of Lithuania with the assent of the Pope. The formation of the Kingdom of Lithuania was a partially successful attempt at unifying all surrounding Baltic tribes, including the Old Prussians, into a single state. Mindaugas and his wife Morta were crowned during the summer of 1253. Bishop Henry Heidenreich of Kulm presided over the ecclesiastical ceremonies and Andreas Stirland conferred the crown. 6 July is now celebrated as Statehood Day (Lithuanian: Valstybės diena); it is an official holiday in modern Lithuania. The exact date of the coronation is not known; the scholarship of historian Edvardas Gudavičius, who promulgated this precise date, is sometimes challenged. The location of the coronation also remains unknown.

=== Luxembourg ===
Luxembourg's sovereign Grand Dukes have never been crowned. Instead, the sovereign is enthroned at a simple ceremony held in the nation's parliament at the beginning of his or her reign to take an oath of loyalty to the state constitution as required by the constitution.

The sovereign then attends a solemn mass at the Notre-Dame Cathedral. No crown or other regalia exists for the rulers of Europe's last sovereign Grand Duchy.

=== Monaco ===
The Principality of Monaco does not possess any regalia and thus does not physically crown its ruler. However, the Prince or Princess does attend a special investiture ceremony, consisting of a festive mass in Saint Nicholas Cathedral, followed by a reception where the new sovereign prince meets his people.

=== Netherlands ===
The Netherlands has never physically crowned its monarchs. The Dutch monarch, however, undergoes a "swearing-in and investiture" ceremony. Article 32 of the Dutch constitution states that as soon as the monarch assumes the royal prerogative, he is to be sworn in and inaugurated in the capital city of Amsterdam at a public joint session of the two houses of the States General. This ritual is held at the Nieuwe Kerk. Regalia such as the crown, orb, and scepter are present but are never physically given to the monarch. Instead, they are placed on cushions, on what is called a credence table. The royal regalia surround a copy of the Dutch constitution. Two other regalia–the sword of state and the standard of the kingdom bearing the coat of arms of the Netherlands–are carried by two senior military officers.

During the ceremony, the monarch, wearing a ceremonial robe, is seated on a chair of state with his or her consort on a raised dais opposite members of the States General. The ceremony consists of two parts. In the first part, the monarch is sworn in: he takes his formal oath to uphold the kingdom's fundamental law and to protect the country with everything within his power. After the king has taken his oath, he is invested by the States General and the States of the other countries of the Kingdom of the Netherlands: members of the States General pay homage to the monarch. The president of the Joint Session of the States General will first make a solemn declaration; all members of the States General and members of the States of Aruba, Curaçao, and St Maarten will then, in turn, swear or affirm this declaration.

=== Norway ===
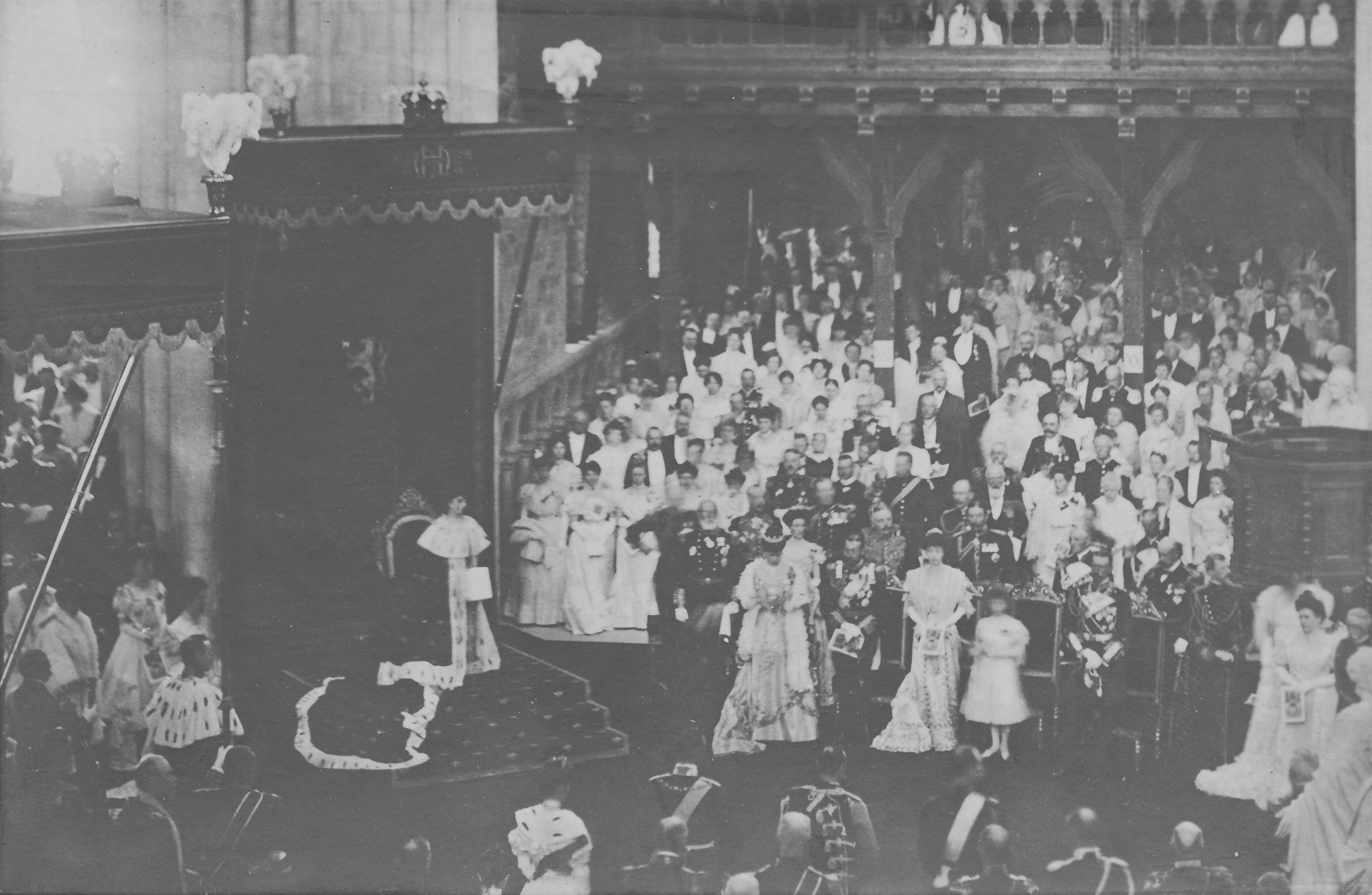
King Haakon VII and Queen Maud of Norway wearing their coronation crowns and robes in 1906.

The first coronation in Norway, and Scandinavia, took place in Bergen in 1163 or 1164. The Christ Church (Old Cathedral) in Bergen remained the place of coronations in Norway until the capital was moved to Oslo under King Haakon V. From then on some coronations were held in Oslo, but most were held in Nidaros Cathedral in Trondheim.

In 1397, Norway, Sweden, and Denmark united in what is referred to as the Kalmar Union, sharing the same monarch. During this period the kings were crowned consecutively in each of the three countries until the union was dissolved in 1523. Following this dissolution, Norway entered into a union in 1524 with Denmark which would eventually evolve to an integrated state that was to last until 1814. No coronations were held in Norway during this time. Meanwhile, the monarch underwent a coronation and later, with the introduction of absolutism in 1660, an anointing ceremony in Denmark.

Following the dissolution of Denmark–Norway, Norway declared its independence and elected the Danish heir as its own king. Christian Frederick would "abdicate" this position following the Swedish-Norwegian War and Norway would be forced into a union with Sweden and elected the King of Sweden as King of Norway. The Norwegian constitution of 1814 required the King of Norway to be crowned in Trondheim. King Karl Johan was subsequently crowned in Stockholm and Trondheim after acceding to the thrones of Sweden and Norway in 1818. Succeeding monarchs would also be crowned separately in Sweden and Norway.

In 1905, the personal union between Sweden and Norway was dissolved. Haakon VII was subsequently elected Norway's monarch. Haakon and his wife Queen Maud were the last to be crowned in Nidaros Cathedral in 1906. Following this, the constitutional provision requiring the coronation was repealed in 1908. Thereafter, the monarch has only been required to take his formal accession oath in the Council of State and then in the parliament, the Storting. King Olav V, desiring a religious ceremony to mark his accession to the throne in 1957, instituted a ceremony of royal consecration, known as Signing til kongsgjerning. This "blessing" rite took place again in 1991, when King Harald V and Queen Sonja were similarly consecrated. Both consecrations were held in Nidaros Cathedral.

=== Poland ===
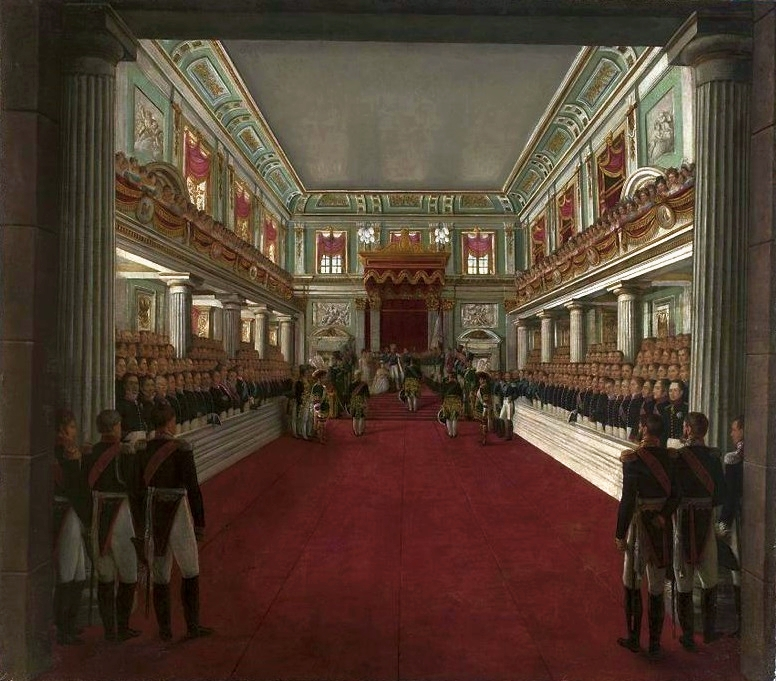
Tsar Nicholas I crowns his wife in the New Senate Chamber at the Royal Castle in Warsaw.

Poland crowned its rulers beginning in 1025; the final such ceremony in the Polish-Lithuanian Commonwealth was in 1764, when its last monarch, Stanisław August Poniatowski, was crowned at St. John's Cathedral, Warsaw. Other coronations took place at Wawel Cathedral in Kraków, and also in Poznań and Gniezno Cathedral. Though many of the Polish Crown Jewels were destroyed by Prussian King Frederick William III, a few pieces are exhibited at the National Museum in Warsaw. Polish coronations were whenever possible conducted as close as possible to the date of the previous sovereign's funeral; this was a concept expressed by Joachim Bielski in the sixteenth century: osoba umiera, korona nie umiera (the royal person dies, the crown dies not). On 24 May 1829, during Congress Poland, Russian Tsar Nicholas I crowned himself king of Poland at the Royal Castle in Warsaw. He was the last crowned Polish monarch.

=== Portugal ===
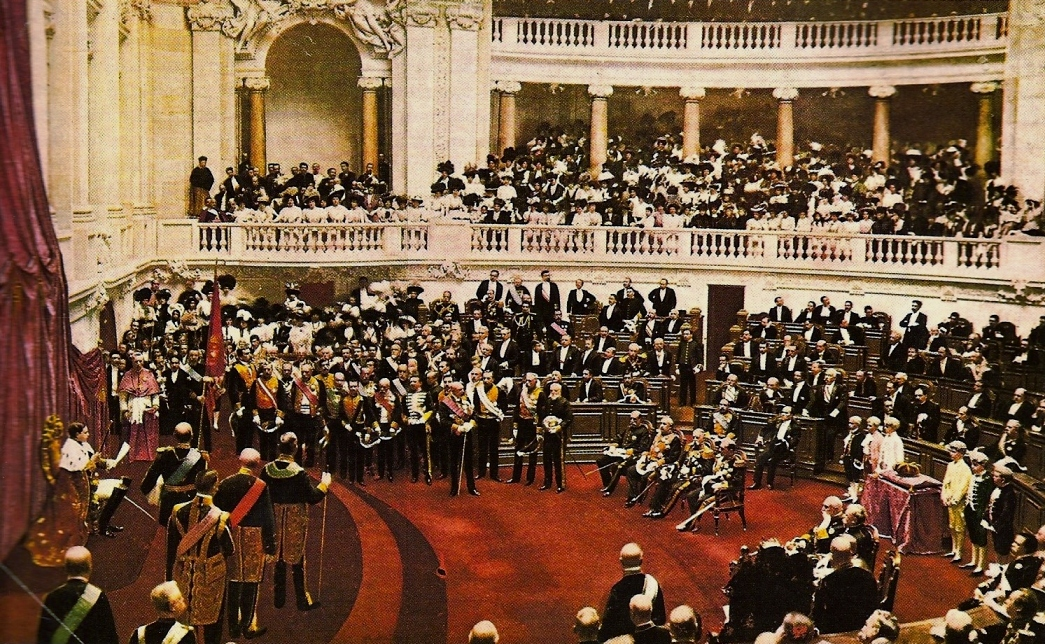
King Manuel II of Portugal and the Algarves, wearing the Mantle of Luís I, on the day of his Acclamation.

In 1646, immediately after his coronation, King João IV of Portugal and the Algarves consecrated the Crown of Portugal to the Virgin Mary, proclaiming her to be the Queen and patroness of his nation. After this act, no Portuguese sovereign ever wore a crown. The Portuguese monarchy was abolished in 1910.

João IV's coronation followed a pattern similar to the coronations of the kings of France and pre-Reformation England, as laid out in the Roman Pontifical. The Habsburg monarchs that preceded João IV as kings of Portugal were also not crowned; during the Iberian Union, the practice of not having a coronation ceremony was extended to Portugal.

Before the assumption of the Portuguese throne by the Habsburgs, kings of Portugal used to be anointed and crowned in the Jeronimos Monastery in Lisbon, in a manner similar to the coronation of João IV. Thereafter, Portuguese monarchs have only been acclaimed.

=== Romania ===
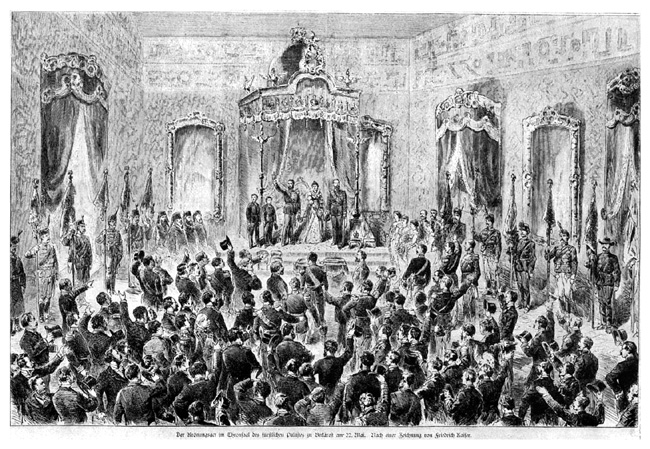
Coronation of King Carol I of the Romanians

The Kingdom of Romania used a coronation ceremony during its monarchical period (1881–1947). Its crown was rather unusual, being made of steel rather than gold or some other precious metal. In 1922, King Ferdinand and Queen Marie were crowned in the courtyard of the newly opened "Coronation Cathedral" in Alba Iulia, an important city in the new Romanian province of Transylvania. Ferdinand crowned himself and then crowned his wife. The coronation service was interdenominational rather than Romanian Orthodox (the majority religion and then the state church), in part because Ferdinand was Roman Catholic, while his wife was Anglican at the time. Ferdinand's son, Carol II, intended to be crowned in September 1930 but abandoned his plans due to marital difficulties with his wife, Queen Helen, which included an ongoing affair with Magda Lupescu. Upon his abdication, his son, Michael I, was crowned and anointed on 6 September 1940 at the Romanian Patriarchal Cathedral in Bucharest by Patriarch Nicodim Munteanu.

=== Russia ===
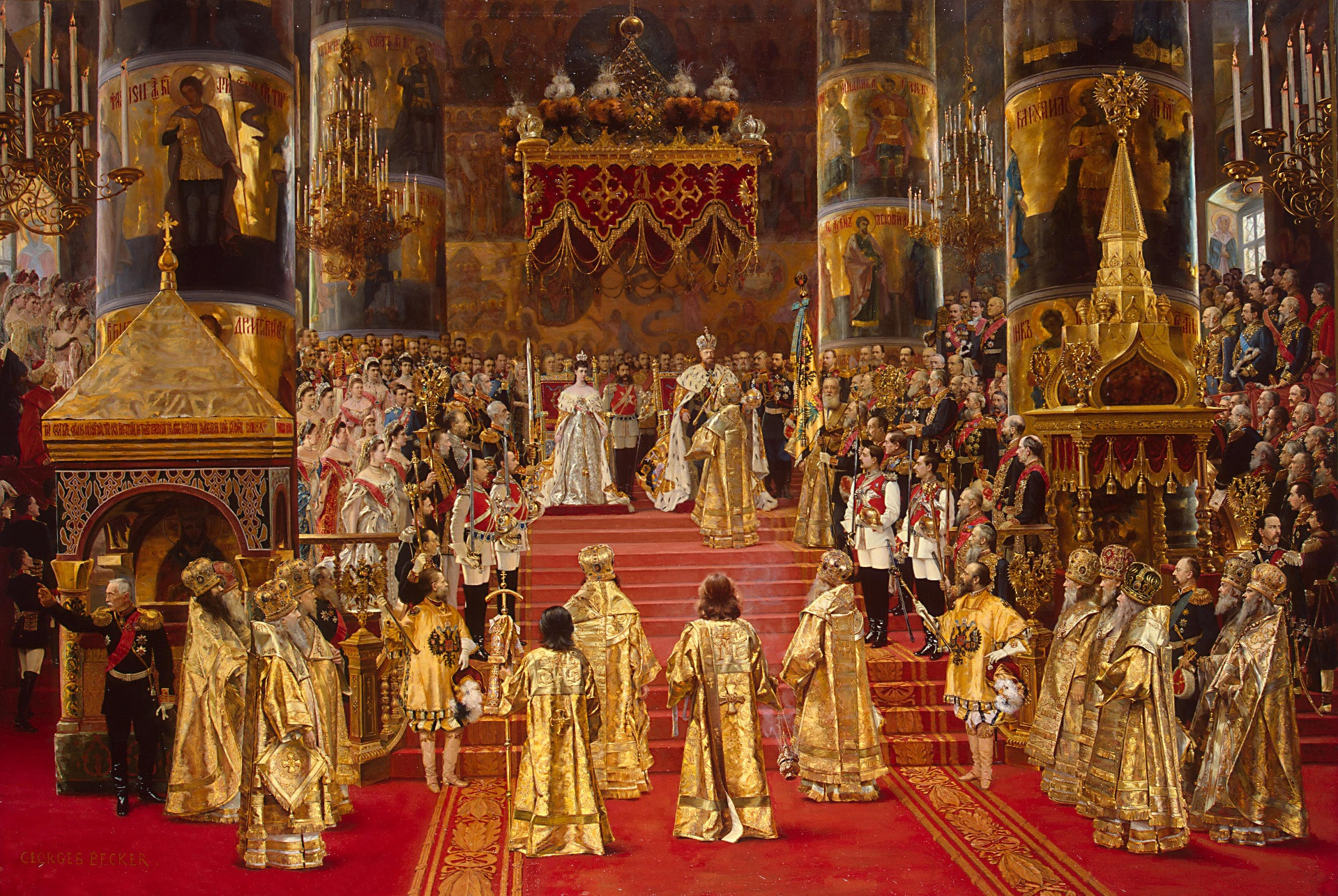
Coronation of Emperor Alexander III of Russia and Empress Maria Fyodorovna in 1883

Following the tradition of the Byzantine Emperors, the Tsar of Russia placed the crown upon his own head. This left no doubt that, in the Russian system, the imperial power came directly from God. The prayer of the Metropolitan, similar to that of the Patriarch of Constantinople for the Byzantine Emperor, confirmed the imperial supremacy.

A few days prior to the crowning service itself, the Tsar made a processional entry into Moscow, where coronations were always held (even when the capital was in St. Petersburg). Following this, the imperial regalia were brought from the Kremlin armory into the Tsar's Kremlin palace, where they would accompany the new emperor on his procession to the Dormition Cathedral on the morning of his coronation. This procession commenced at the Red Porch and ended at the church doors, where the presiding prelate and other bishops blessed the Tsar and his consort with holy water and offered them the Holy Cross to kiss.

After the Tsar entered the cathedral, he and his spouse venerated the icons there and took their places on two thrones set up in the center of the cathedral. After the sovereign had recited the Nicene Creed as his profession of faith, and after an invocation of the Holy Spirit and a litany, the emperor assumed the purple chlamys, and the crown was then presented to him. He took it and placed it on his head himself, while the Metropolitan recited:

"In the name of the Father, and of the Son, and of the Holy Spirit, Amen."

The Metropolitan would then make the following short address:

"Most God-fearing, absolute, and mighty Lord, Tsar of all the Russias, this visible and tangible adornment of thy head is an eloquent symbol that thou, as the head of the whole Russian people, art invisibly crowned by the King of kings, Christ, with a most ample blessing, seeing that He bestows upon thee entire authority over His people."

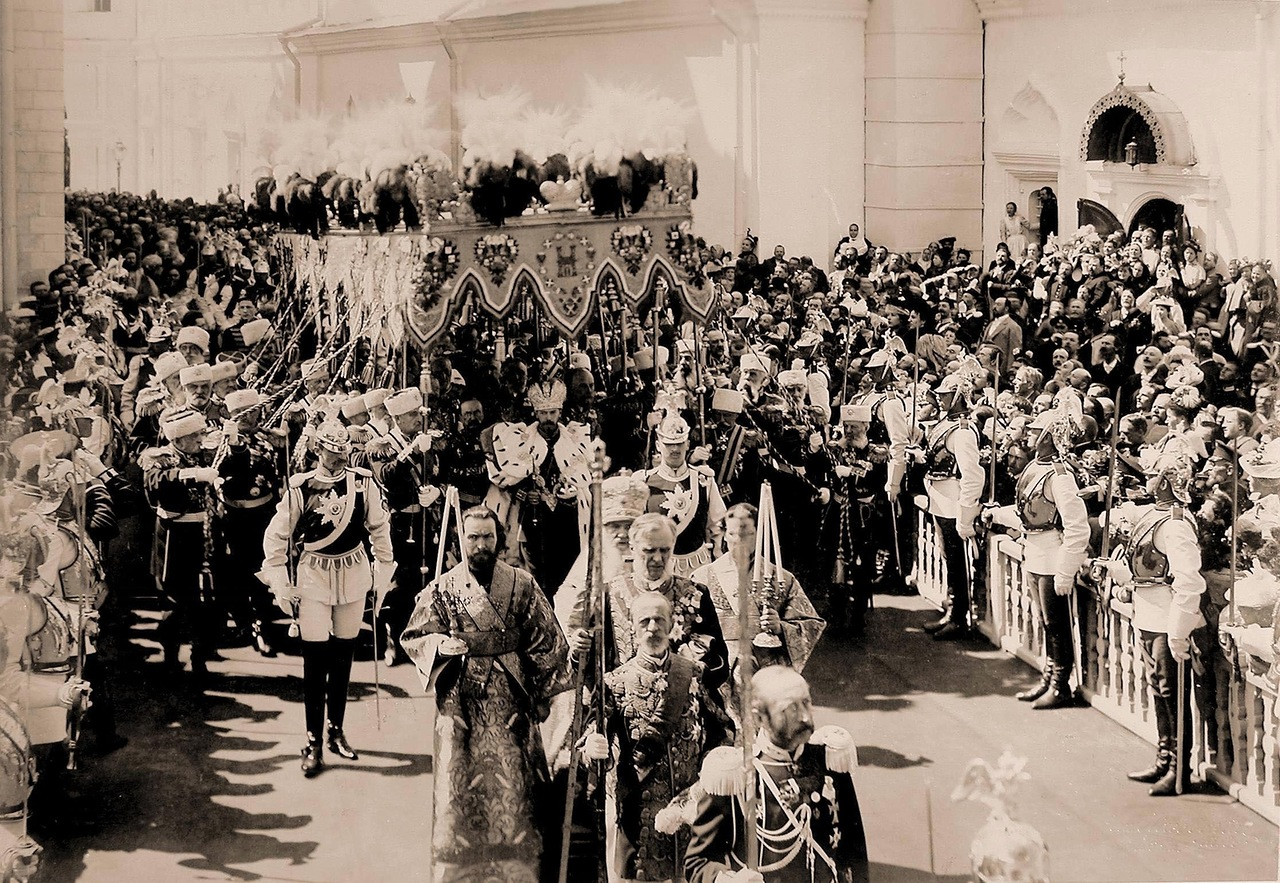
Coronation Parade of Nicholas II

Following this, the new Tsar crowned his consort, first briefly with his own crown (by touching it momentarily to her head before putting it back on his own), then with a smaller crown of her own. Further prayers and litanies were read, then the Emperor was anointed just prior to the reception of Holy Communion during the Divine Liturgy. He was invited to enter the altar area through the Royal Doors (normally reserved solely to the clergy) and partake of Communion as a priest would, in both kinds. Further prayers and blessings concluded the service, which was followed by a special feast held in the Kremlin's Palace of Facets.

Russia's last coronation was in 1896, for Tsar Nicholas II and Empress Alexandra. The last occasion on which the Great Imperial Crown was officially used was the State Opening of the Duma in 1906.

=== Serbia ===
King Peter I of Serbia immediately after his coronation

The first crowned King of Serbia, Stefan Nemanjić, was crowned twice. In 1217, he was crowned in a Roman Catholic ceremony by a papal legate with a crown sent by the Pope. However, Stefan and the Serbian people were Eastern Orthodox, so he appealed to the Patriarch of Constantinople. The Patriarch elevated Stefan's brother Sava to the rank of archbishop and authorized Stephan's second coronation, performed by Sava himself in 1222. His successors were also crowned kings at the monastery of Žiča. Stefan Dušan had himself crowned emperor by patriarchs of Bulgaria and Serbia, as he was aware that the Patriarch of Constantinople would not bestow the imperial title upon the ruler of a Balkan country. Nevertheless, the coronation ceremony was an elaborate replica of the Byzantine coronation.

Serbia's last coronation was in 1904, when King Peter I was crowned in an Eastern Orthodox Christian ceremony at the Cathedral of the Host of Holy Archangels in Belgrade. Serbia became a part of the Kingdom of Yugoslavia after the First World War, but Peter did not hold a second coronation and neither of his two successors, Alexander and Peter II, were crowned.

=== Spain ===
No monarch of Spain has been crowned as such since Isabella I of Castile (1474), Ferdinand II of Aragon (1414), and Catherine of Navarre with her husband John III of Navarre (1494). Joan III of Navarre was crowned as late as 1555, although she ruled Navarre beyond the Pyrenees. Instead, the new monarch takes a formal oath to uphold the Constitution at the Cortes. Although the crown is displayed at the ceremony, it is never actually placed on the monarch's head. Historical Castilian coronations were performed at Toledo, or the Church of St Jerome in Madrid, with the king being anointed by the archbishop of Toledo. The monarch assumed the royal sword, scepter, crown of gold and the apple of gold, after receiving his anointing. Aragonese coronations were performed at Zaragoza by the Archbishop of Tarragona.

Five days after his visit to the Cortes, King Juan Carlos I attended an "Enthronement Mass" at the Church of San Jerónimo el Real in Madrid. Accompanied by his wife Sofia, he was escorted beneath a canopy to a set of thrones set up near the high altar. Following the service, the king and queen returned to the palace, where they greeted the people from the balcony, reviewed troops, and attended a formal banquet.

=== Sweden ===
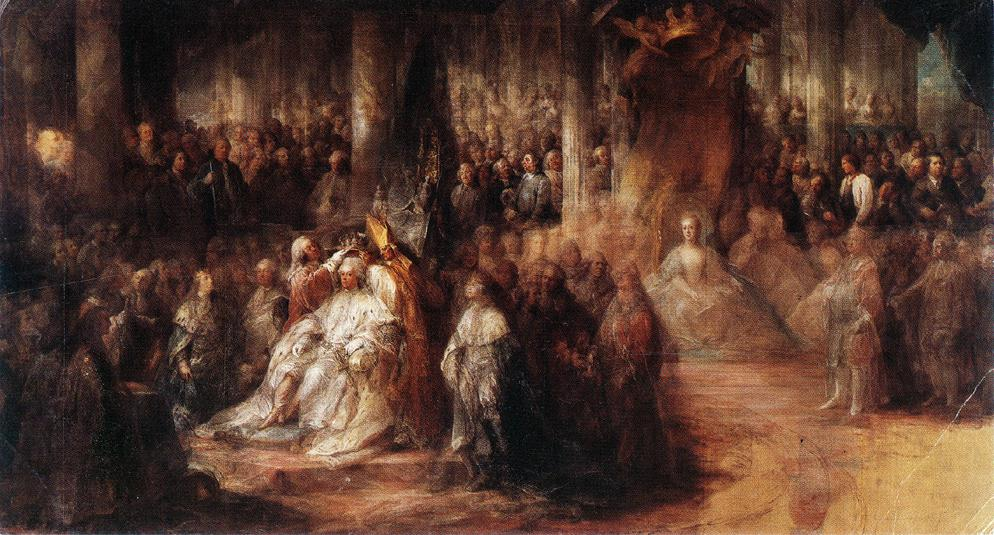
Coronation of King Gustav III of Sweden

Swedish monarchs were crowned in various cities during the 13th and 14th centuries, but from the middle of the 15th century on in either the Cathedral in Uppsala or Storkyrkan in Stockholm, with the exception of the coronation of Gustav IV Adolf, which took place in Norrköping in 1800. Earlier coronations were also held at Uppsala, the ecclesiastical center of Sweden. Prior to Sweden's change into a hereditary monarchy, the focus of the coronation rite was on legitimising an elected king.

Nineteenth-century coronations of Swedish monarchs followed a rite last used during the coronation of Oscar II in 1873:

The king and queen proceeded to the Cathedral in separate processions. The king was met at the front portal by the Archbishop of Uppsala, highest prelate in the Church of Sweden, together with other bishops in their copes. The Archbishop greeted the king: "Blessed be he who cometh in the Name of the Lord", while the Bishop of Skara said a prayer that the king might be endowed with the grace to govern his people well. The Archbishop and bishops then escorted the king to his seat on the right-hand side of the choir, with the Royal Standard on his right side and the banner of the Order of the Seraphim on his left.

The Bishop of Strängnäs and the rest of the bishops then awaited the approach of the queen; when she arrived the Bishop of Strängnäs greeted her with: "Blessed is she who cometh in the Name of the Lord", while the Bishop of Härnösand said a prayer virtually identical to the one previously said for the king. The Bishop of Strängnäs and the other bishops then escorted the queen to her seat on the left-hand side of the choir where the king and queen both knelt for a few moments of private prayer while the regalia were deposited upon the altar.

The Archbishop began the service by singing: "Holy, holy, holy, Lord God of Sabaoth", the normal beginning of Swedish High Mass. The Bishop of Skara recited the Creed before the altar and the hymn "Come, thou Holy Spirit, come" was sung. The Litany and then an anthem was sung during which the king went to his throne on a dais before the altar with the Royal Standard being borne on his right and the banner of the Order of the Seraphim on his left. Following this, the Regalia was brought forward. The king's mantle and Crown Prince's coronet were removed and placed on the altar, and the kneeling king was vested in the Royal Mantle by a state minister while the Archbishop read the first chapter of the Gospel of St. John. The Minister of Justice recited the oath to the king, which he took while laying three fingers on the Bible.

Following this, the Archbishop anointed the king on his forehead, breast, temples and wrists, saying:

The Almighty everlasting God pour out His Holy Spirit into your soul and mind, plans and undertakings, by whose gift may you so rule land and kingdom as to redound to the honour and glory of God, maintain justice and equity and be for the good of the land and people.

The king then rose and resumed his seat on his throne, where the Archbishop and the Minister of Justice crowned him conjointly, the Archbishop praying a prepared prayer that the king's reign might be good and prosperous. The king was then invested with the Sceptre by Archbishop and the Minister for Foreign Affairs, while the Orb was given him by Count Hamilton, the Archbishop reading set prayers for both of these events. A Key was then delivered to the king by the Major-General of Nordin, as the Archbishop said the following prayer:

God the Almighty who of His divine providence hath raised you to this royal dignity, grant you to unlock treasures of wisdom and truth for your people, to lock out error, vices and sloth from your kingdom and to provide for the industrious prosperity and increase, relief and comfort for the suffering and afflicted.

The unsheathed coronation sword was then placed in the king's hand as the Archbishop said a prayer that the king might use his power well and justly. The Archbishop returned to the altar. With the king seated on his throne, crowned and bearing the Sceptre in his right hand and the Orb in his left, the State Herald standing behind the throne now cried out:

Now has (name) been crowned king over the lands of Swedes, the Goths, and the Wends. He and no other.

A hymn was then sung, following which the Archbishop said a prayer and gave the king his blessing.

As a second anthem was sung, the queen now left her seat in the choir and proceeded to her throne on the dais before the altar. She knelt, was invested in her Royal Mantle, anointed by the Archbishop on her forehead and wrists, and crowned by the Archbishop. Taking her seat on her throne, she was next invested with her Sceptre and Orb, the Archbishop using the forms used for the king, but appropriately adapted for the queen. Then the State Herald, standing behind her throne, proclaimed her queen, and the choir sang "Prosperity to the Queen", followed by the singing of a hymn. The Archbishop next said a prayer similar to the one he said for the king and gave the queen his blessing.

Homage was now done, following which the procession left the cathedral during the singing of the hymn, "Now thank we all our God".

This rite was last used to crown Oscar II in 1873; subsequent kings of Sweden elected not to be crowned, though there is no law or constitutional provision preventing a coronation. The current monarch, Carl XVI Gustaf, simply took the then-required regal assurance (Konungaförsäkran) during a meeting of the cabinet and afterward was enthroned in a simple ceremony at the throne room of the Royal Palace in Stockholm on 19 September 1973. The crown jewels were displayed on cushions to the right and left of the royal throne, but were never given to the king. Carl Gustaf made an accession speech, which comprised the main purpose of the undertaking.

=== United Kingdom ===
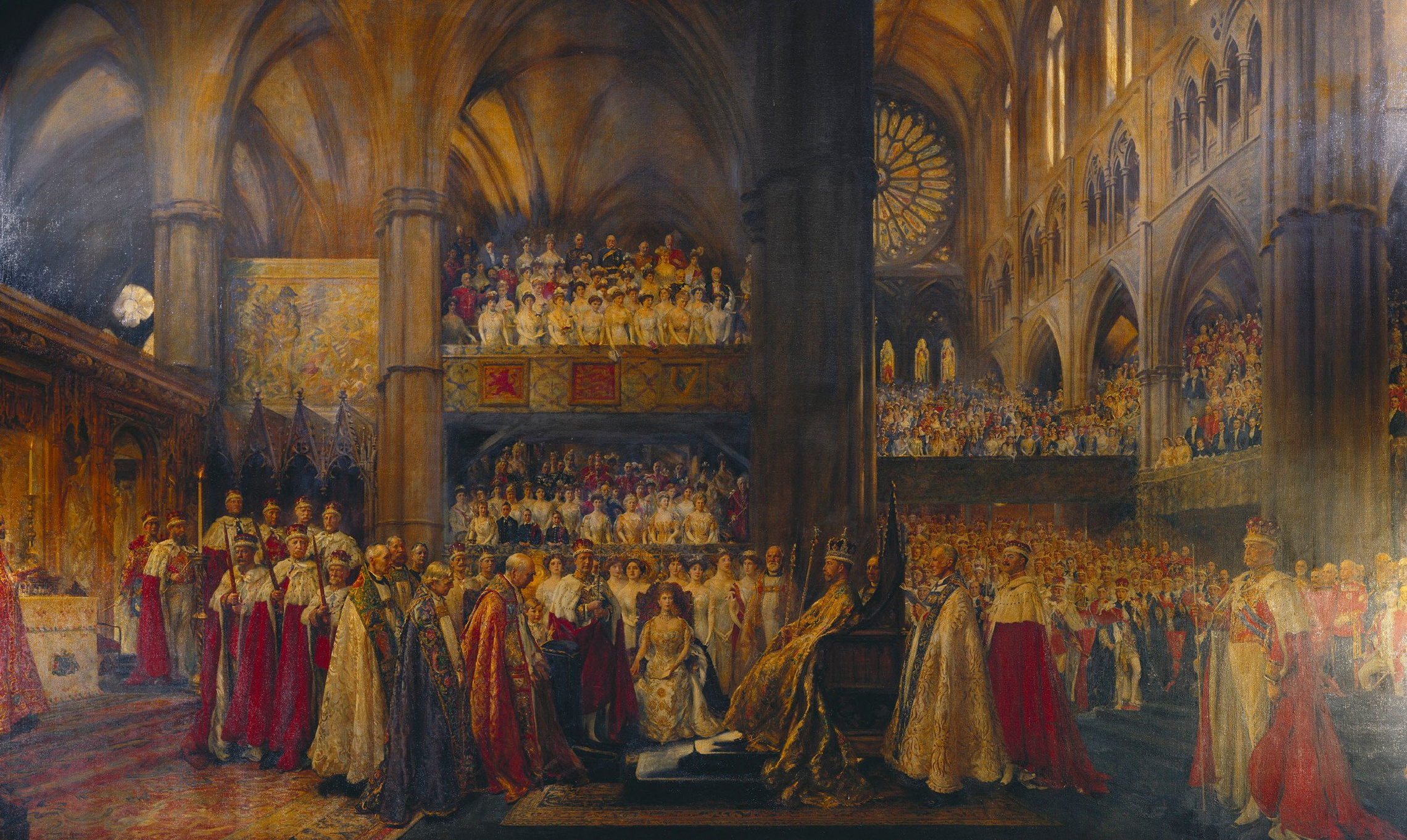
Coronation of King George V

The United Kingdom is the only monarchy in Europe that still practices coronations.

The coronation of the British monarch takes place at Westminster Abbey. Since the British sovereign is the supreme governor of the Church of England, his or her coronation does not take place in a cathedral—which would be the domain of a bishop—but at Westminster Abbey, which is a Royal Peculiar (a church directly under the monarch). The monarch and their consort enter the abbey in procession and is seated on a "Chair of Estate" as the Archbishop of Canterbury goes to the east, south, west, and north of the building asking if those present are willing to pay homage to their new sovereign. Once the attendees respond affirmatively, the Archbishop administers the Coronation Oath, and a Bible is presented by both the Archbishop (representing the Church of England) and, since 1953, the Moderator of the General Assembly of the Church of Scotland. Once this is done, the actual crowning can take place.

The monarch is seated upon the ancient Coronation Chair, which would include the Scottish Stone of Scone (kept in Edinburgh Castle when not in use). A canopy is held over the sovereign's head, while the Archbishop anoints him or her with holy oil on the hands, breast, and head, concluding with a special blessing. Spurs and the Sword of State are presented, followed by the Sovereign's Orb (which is immediately returned to the altar), the Sceptre with the Dove and the Sceptre with the Cross. Once this is done, the Archbishop of Canterbury places the Crown of St. Edward upon the monarch's head. If a queen consort is present, she is crowned shortly afterward in a similar but shorter and simpler ceremony. (Note: This applies to female consorts only. If the new monarch is a female, her husband (if any) is not crowned.) (Note: For example, Anne Boleyn was crowned Queen of England with St. Edward's crown (which had previously been used to crown only a reigning monarch) because Anne's pregnancy was visible by then and she was carrying the heir who was presumed to be male. Thus, Anne's coronation did not only legitimise her right to enjoy the title and prerogatives of Queen of England but also her unborn child's right to be crowned as monarch with St. Edward's Crown one day. Compare with the coronation of an Heir Apparent, discussed above, though in this case the child was not explicitly crowned.)

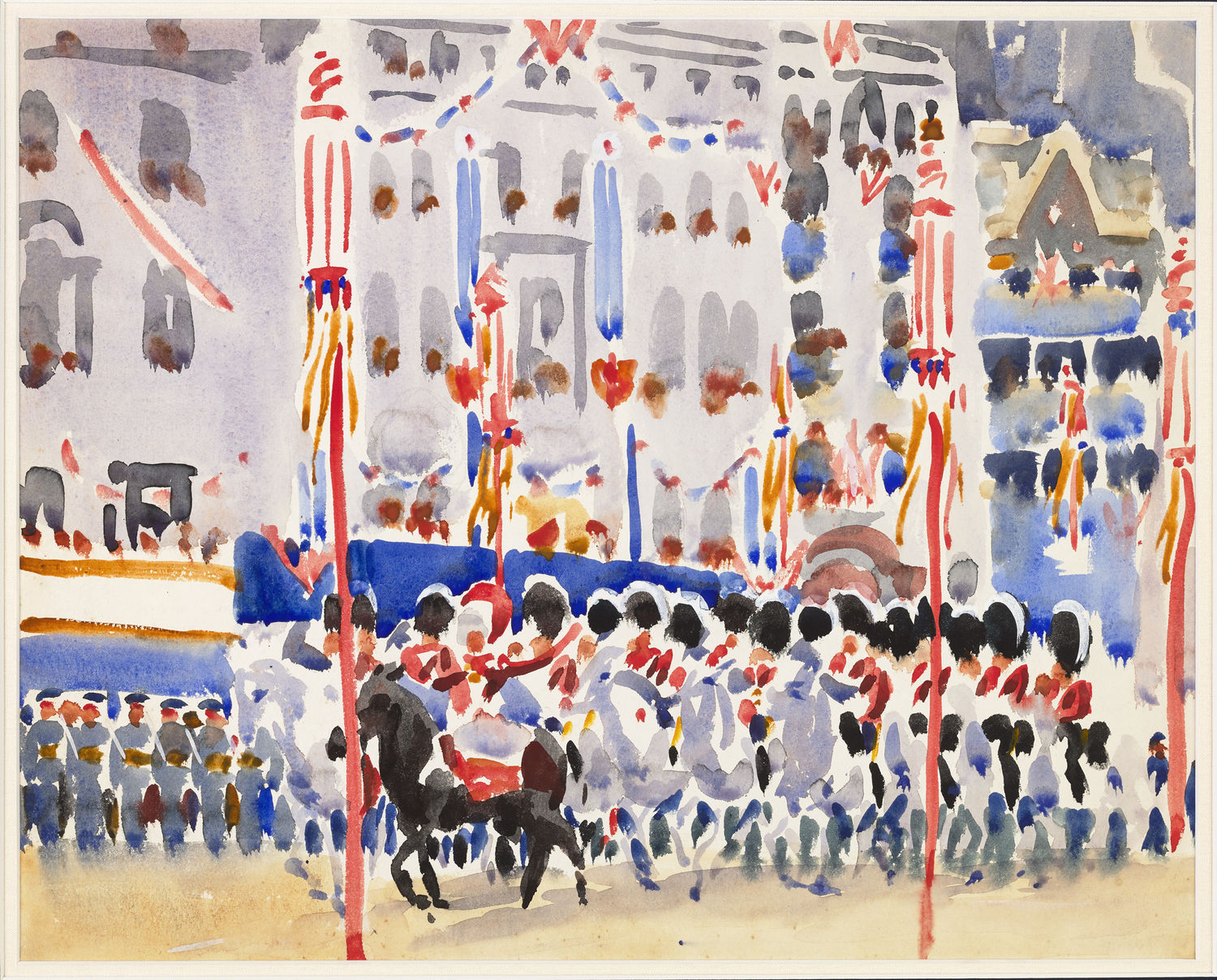
Mounted Band of The Scots Greys, Coronation Parade, 1937 by Harry Greville Wood Irwin. Painted in 1937, depicting the Coronation of King George VI of the United Kingdom.

Afterward, the sovereign is seated upon the throne and receives homage from various members of the British clergy and nobility. Holy Communion is given to the sovereign, who then enters St. Edward's Chapel as the Te Deum is sung. The sovereign exchanges St. Edward's Crown for the lighter Imperial State Crown and exits the abbey wearing the crown and carrying the Sceptre with the Cross and Orb as "God Save the King (or Queen)" is sung.

The ceremonies as conducted for Elizabeth II in 1953 and Charles III in 2023 also functioned as the coronation rite for the realms within the Commonwealth which recognise the British monarch as head of state. In the case of the former, the text of the administered oath named the seven separate Commonwealth kingdoms in existence as the time, as well as a general statement regarding other territories. (Note: The text of the oath is as follows: "Will you solemnly promise and swear to govern the Peoples of the United Kingdom of Great Britain and Northern Ireland, Canada, Australia, New Zealand, the Union of South Africa, Pakistan and Ceylon, and of your Possessions and other Territories to any of them belonging or pertaining, according to their respective laws and customs?")

The Prince of Wales, a title traditionally held by the heir to the British throne, may go through a ceremony of his own known as the investiture of the Prince of Wales, though such a ritual is not required to hold this title or the privileges that come with it. The ceremony, when held, may take place in Wales or in England (the most recent investitures took place at Caernarvon Castle, Wales), and includes the placement of a coronet upon the prince's head.

==== England ====
This section describes coronations held in England prior to its unification with Scotland. For coronations after that time, see below under "United Kingdom".

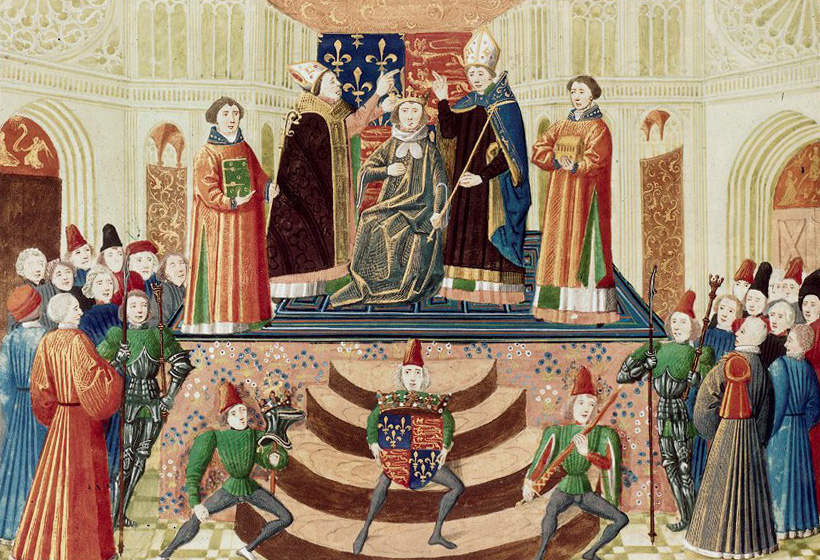
Coronation of Henry IV of England at Westminster in 1399

Westminster Abbey has long been England's coronation church since 1066. From William the Conqueror through to Charles III, all except two monarchs have been crowned in the Abbey.

Following the start of the reformation in England, the boy king Edward VI had been crowned in the first Protestant coronation in 1547, during which Archbishop Thomas Cranmer preached a sermon against idolatry and "the tyranny of the bishops of Rome". However, six years later, he was succeeded by his half-sister Mary I, who restored the Roman Catholic rite. In 1559, Elizabeth I underwent the last English coronation under the auspices of the Catholic Church; however, Elizabeth's insistence on changes to reflect her Protestant beliefs resulted in several bishops refusing to officiate at the service and it was conducted by the low-ranking bishop of Carlisle, Owen Oglethorpe.

After the Union of the Crowns in 1603 England and Scotland shared the same monarch.

==== Scotland ====
This section describes coronations held in Scotland prior to its unification with England. For coronations after that time, see below under "United Kingdom".

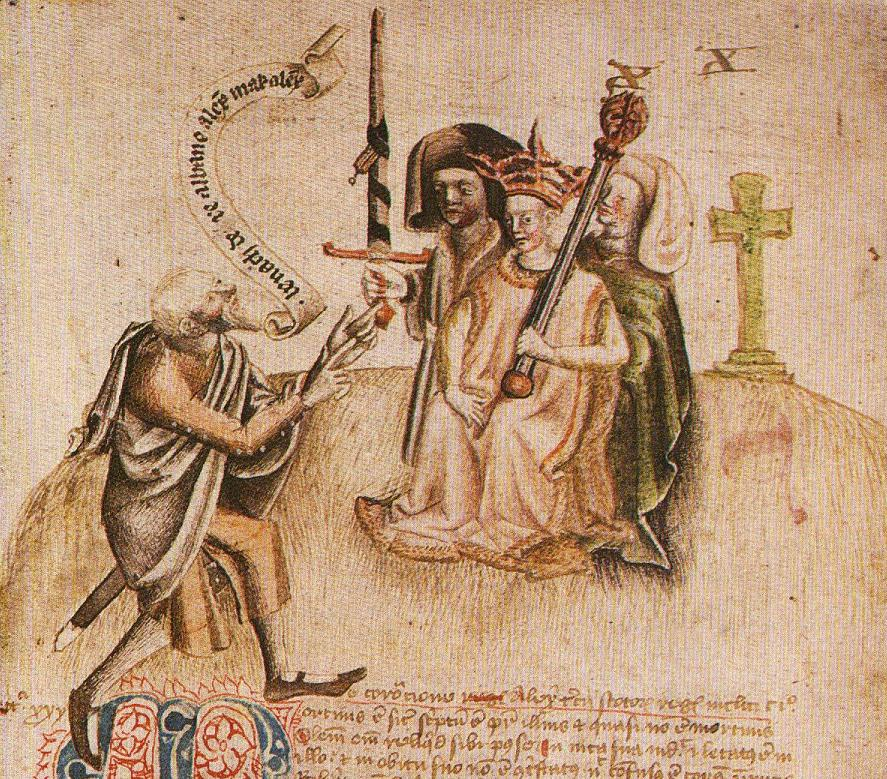
Coronation of King Alexander III of Scotland on Moot Hill, Scone. He is being greeted by the ollamh rígh, the royal poet.

Kings of Scotland were crowned at Scone Abbey, in the town of Scone, a few miles north of Perth. Prior to 1296, the king was seated upon the famed Stone of Scone throughout the ceremony; this was considered an essential element of the ritual. Following the removal of the stone to England by Edward I, coronations continued to be staged at the abbey or at Stirling. The Honours of Scotland, the oldest Crown jewels in Britain, were used in all coronation ceremonies up to that of Charles II, the final king to be crowned in Scotland.

One feature of Scottish coronations was the ollamh rígh, or royal poet, who addressed the new monarch with Beannachd Dé Rígh Alban, or "God Bless the King of Scotland". The poet went on to recite the monarch's genealogy back to the first ever Scotsman. It was traditional in Gaelic-speaking cultures like Scotland that a king's legitimacy be established by recitation of the royal pedigree. Scottish rulers did not necessarily have to wait for any certain age to be crowned: Mary, Queen of Scots was crowned at nine months of age, while her son, James VI, was crowned at thirteen months. Mary's father, James V, was barely seventeen months of age at the time of his coronation. The last Scottish coronation was at Scone in 1651 for King Charles II.

After the unification with England in 1707, the Scottish coronation rite, with that of the English rite, was subsumed into the British.

=== The Vatican ===
From 1305 to 1963 popes were crowned with the papal tiara in a coronation ceremony in St. Peter's Basilica in Rome. Following the decision of the last crowned pope, Paul VI, to lay the papal tiara on the high altar of the basilica as a symbol of humility, the next four popes declined to wear it, and instituted a ceremony of papal inauguration rather than a formal coronation. While the popes John Paul I, John Paul II (who also completely abandoned the use of the sedia gestatoria, a portable throne), Benedict XVI, Francis and Leo XIV opted for an inauguration instead of a coronation, any future pope can, in theory, opt for the coronation ritual.

== See also ==
- Coronation of the Virgin

== Notes ==
This section contains expansions on the main text of the article, as well as links provided for context that may not meet Wikipedia standards for reliable sources, due largely to being self-published.

=== Photos ===
- Enthronements in Royal Europe: 1964-2000 Contains details and photos of several recent European enthronements.

=== Video ===
- Consecration ceremony for King Olav V of Norway. Contains video from Consecration of Olav V of Norway.
- A Queen Is Crowned. Coronation of Elizabeth II of Great Britain in 1953, in seven parts.
