= Tancred Tancredi =

Tancred Tancredi (1185 – 9 September 1241), also called Tancred of Siena, was an Italian ecclesiastic, a missionary, one of the first generation of Dominican friars, and a personal friend of Dominic of Osma. He is often confused with contemporary and fellow Dominican Tancred of Bologna, since the two of them are impossible to always distinguish in the sources. Tancred has been accredited many conversions and even miracles and by some accounts is beatified.

Tancred was born in Siena to wealthy parents of the Tancredi clan. They oversaw his extensive education, sending him first to the University of Bologna and thence to Paris, where he received his doctorate. He returned from Paris to Siena, where he first heard the preaching of Dominic in the Sienese cathedral. According to later reports, he had a vision of the Virgin Mary standing beside Dominic and after the sermon she approached Tancred and beseeched him to "follow that man; and do not depart from him." In the Hospital of Saint Mary Magdalene Tancred received the habit from Dominic and embarked upon a life of religion.

In an early incident related by Tancred to Jordan of Saxony, Dominic was visiting the prior's church when a young relative of Stephen Orsini, Cardinal Abbot of Fossanova, was carried past in a litter after falling from a horse. According to Jordan, it was unknown if he was alive or dead, but at the insistence of Tancred, Dominic prayed to God for the boy's life and he was miraculously healed. This story was amplified by later retellings. The boy is Napoleon, Stephen's nephew, and Stephen faints upon hearing the news, falling into Dominic's arms. At Tancred's urging, it is Stephen who prays to God and receives a miracle: the boy, dead, is brought back to life.

Tancred was probably the prior of San Sisto Vecchio in Rome until it was converted into a Dominican nunnery. He was transferred to Santa Sabina to continue serving as prior. In 1222, after the death of Dominic the previous year, Tancred left Italy for the Holy Land as the superior of a group of friars, appointed by Jordan of Saxony to establish a mission there. Tancred founded several houses in the Latin East and it is claimed that he won many converts, to Christianity and to mendicancy. Though Tancred did not remain at the head of the Dominicans in the Holy Land, he did remain there until his death in 1241.

The Dominican historian and hagiographer Gregory Lombardelli, wrote the first biography of Tancred, Vita de Tancredo Tancredi. He ascribes to him several works of as yet unpublished literature: commentaries on the Scriptures and on Peter Lombard's Book of Sentences. These were probably written during the period after his return to Siena and before his entrance into the order.
