= Tancredo dos Santos =

Brazilian politician (born 1988)

Member of the Legislative Assembly of Ceará
- Incumbent
- Assumed office 1 February 2027

Personal details
- Born: 10 May 1988 (age 38)
- Party: Liberal Party

Tancredo dos Santos Moreira (born 10 May 1988) is a Brazilian politician who was elected member of the Legislative Assembly of Ceará in 2026. He has been a municipal councillor of Caucaia since 2025.
