= Tancredi Fassini =

Italian ice hockey player

- Born: 27 December 1900; Turin, Kingdom of Italy
- Died: 4 September 1943 (aged 42); Fascist Italy
- Position: Defense
- Played for: Torino [CP]
- National team: Italy
- Playing career: 1923–1924

Tancredi Fassini-Camossi (27 December 1900 – 4 September 1943) was an Italian professional ice hockey defense who played for the Italian national team.

== Personal life ==
Fassini served as an engineer and pilot in the Regia Aeronautica during the Second World War. On 4 September 1943, after hearing about the death of his mother at Pisa in an Allied bombing raid 5 days earlier, Fassini took off in a stolen aircraft to fly to Pisa. During the flight, he crashed and was killed.

== Career statistics ==
=== International career ===
			Regular season					Playoffs
Season	Team	Competition	GP	G	A	Pts	PIM	GP	G	A	Pts	PIM
1924	Italy	European Championships	2	0	0	0	—	—	—	–	–	–
International career totals			2	0	0	0	–	–	–	–	–	–
