= Tancred of Bologna =

Tancred of Bologna or of Germany (c. 1185 – 1230/1236), commonly just Tancredus, was a Dominican preacher and canonist. He is easily conflated with a contemporary Dominican, Tancred Tancredi, and the two are sometimes indistinguishable in the sources and have been treated as one person, though this is known to be false.

Tancred's origins lie in Germany, where, if his hagiographers are to be believed, he was a soldier of middle rank at the court of the Emperor Frederick II. He was educated under John of Wales at the University of Bologna. He wrote an important gloss on the Compilatio tertia and the Summa de matrimonio (Summary of Marriage), which was influential to Ramon de Penyafort, as well as the Ordo iudiciarius, completed in 1216, which was the culmination of the procedural literature of the glossators and was translated into both German and French, indicating its importance for medieval legal practice. He supported the emergent doctrine of Papal infallibility and the sect of the Humiliati. He was one of the teachers of Bernard of Botone.

He was at Bologna when he received the habit of a friar, either from Dominic of Osma or Reginald of Bologna, traditionally between 1218 and 1220, though he was active as a writer in Bologna between about 1210 and 1215. One of his first posts as a Dominican clergyman was as a prior in Rome.

== Bibliography ==
- Andrews, Frances (1999). The Early Humiliati. Cambridge: Cambridge University Press.
- Bisson, Thomas N. (1989). Medieval France and her Pyrenean Neighbours: Studies in Early Institutional History. London: Hambledon.
- O'Daniel, Victor F. (1928). "Tancred of Germany." The First Disciples of Saint Dominic: Adapted and Enlarged from Father Anthony Touron's Histoire Abrégée des Premiers Disciples de saint Dominique. Somerset, Ohio: The Rosary Press.
