= Wedding of Frederik, Crown Prince of Denmark, and Princess Ingrid of Sweden =

1935 royal wedding in Stockholm Cathedral

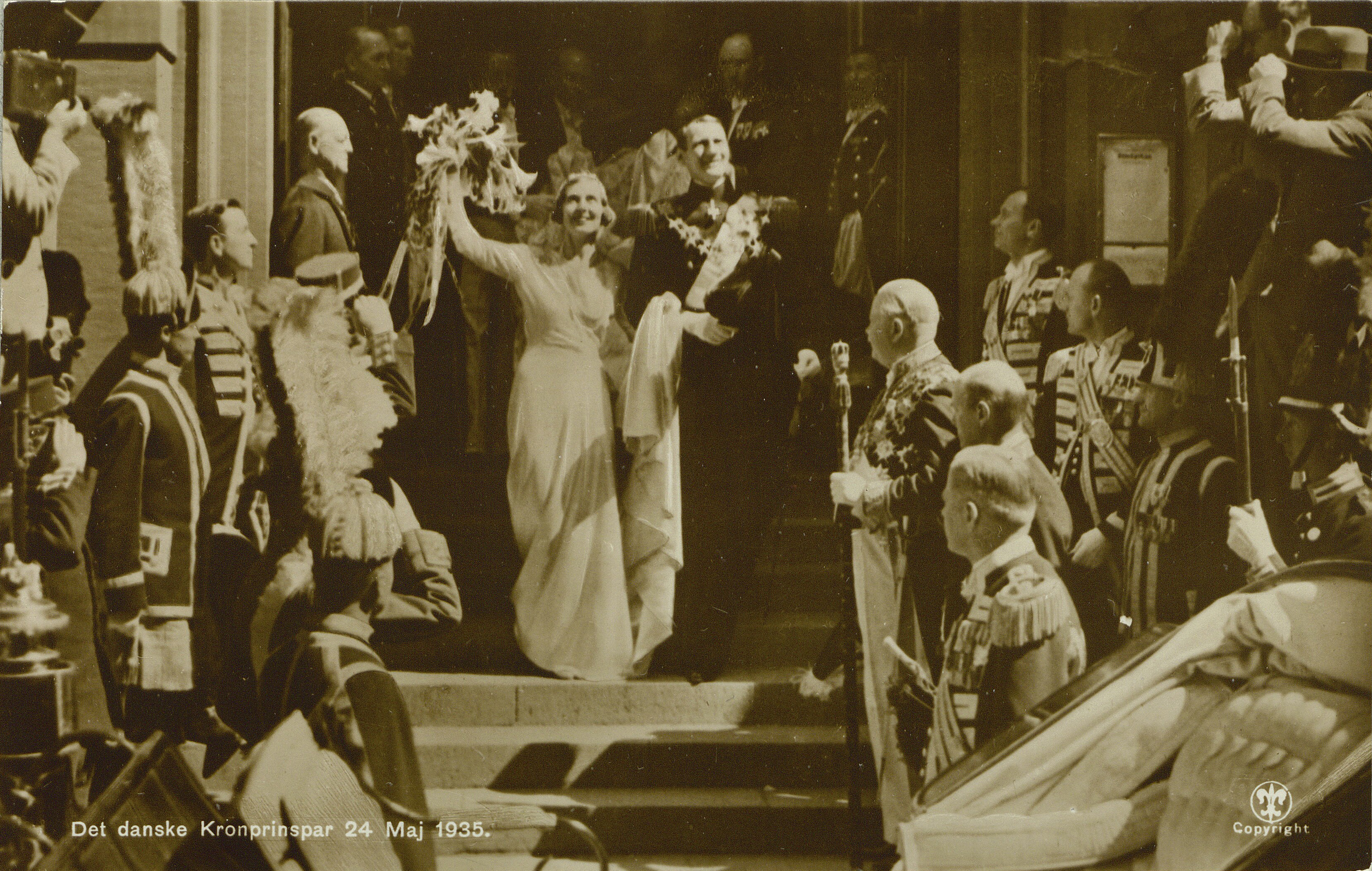
- Frederik and Ingrid exiting Stockholm Cathedral after their wedding
- Date: 24 May 1935
- Venue: Stockholm Cathedral
- Location: Stockholm, Sweden
- Participants: Frederik, Crown Prince of Denmark; Princess Ingrid of Sweden

The wedding of Frederik, Crown Prince of Denmark (later King Frederik IX), and Princess Ingrid of Sweden took place on Friday, 24 May 1935 in Storkyrkan.

Crown Prince Frederik was the heir apparent to the Danish throne and Princess Ingrid was the granddaughter of King Gustaf V of Sweden.

== Engagement ==
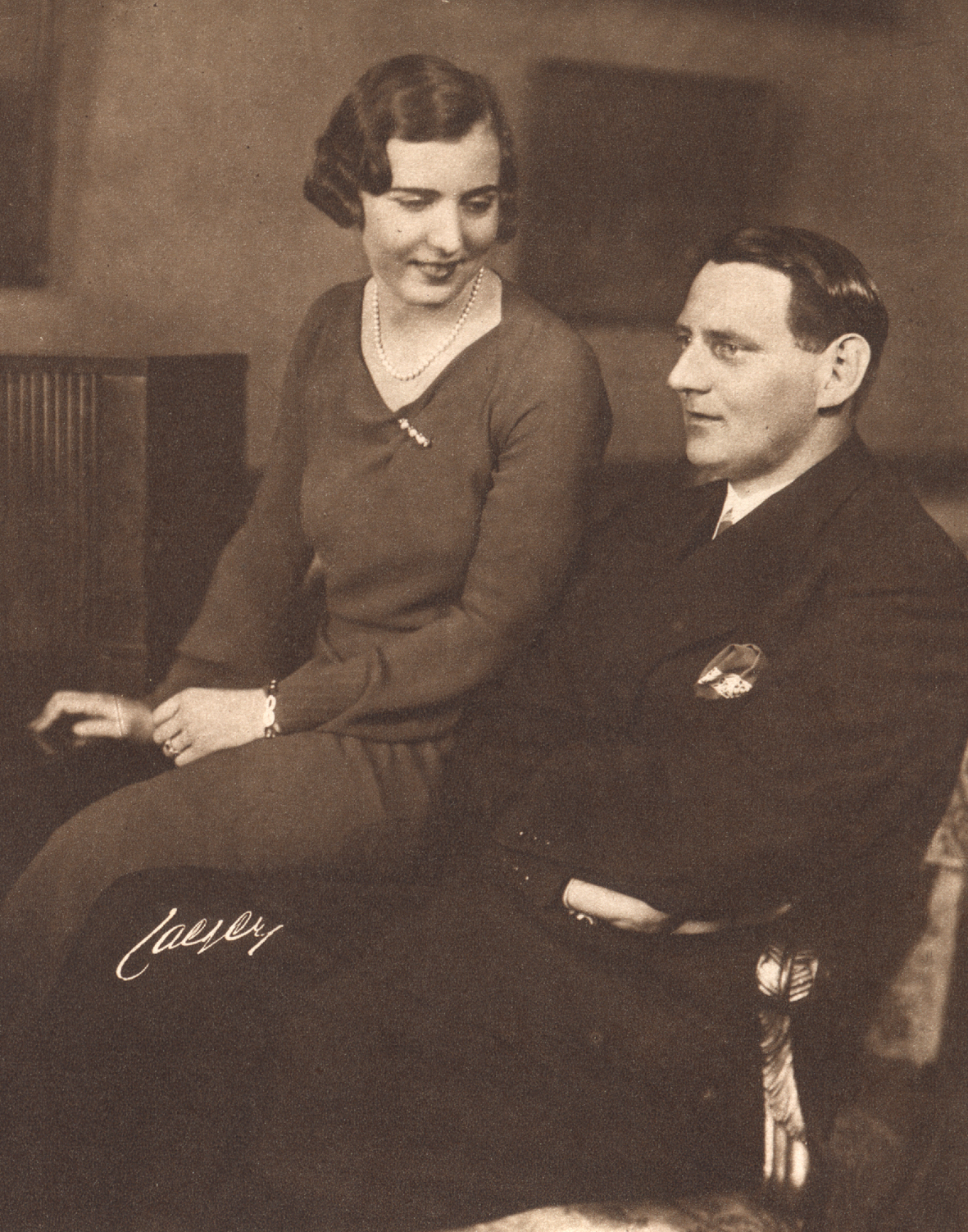
Ingrid and Frederik during their engagement, 1935

Before their engagement, the marriages of Crown Prince Frederik and Princess Ingrid had been the topic of much conversation in their respective countries. False rumours of an engagement between the pair were spread on numerous occasions, including in 1918, 1929 and 1934. The pair had also both been previously linked to other royal persons.

Frederik's mother, Queen Alexandrine, had originally considered the two youngest daughters of her cousin, Nicholas II of Russia, Grand Duchesses Maria and Anastasia, as possible wives for Frederik, prior to their execution in 1918. Later, Frederik met his second cousin, Princess Olga of Greece and Denmark, in Cannes and their engagement was announced on 5 March 1922 before being called off two months later.

The question of Ingrid's future marriage was the topic of much conversation in the 1920s. Among others, she was seen by some as a possible wife for the heir apparent to the British throne, Edward, Prince of Wales, who was her second cousin. Her mother, Princess Margaret of Connaught, and the Prince's father, King George V, were first cousins, both being grandchildren of Queen Victoria. She was also considered a match for his younger brother, Prince George. Neither of these matches came to fruition.

Despite court officials denying an engagement in January 1935, their engagement was announced on 15 March 1935. In a 1969 interview, Frederik revealed the couple had gotten engaged in private in the beginning of February. The couple were double third cousins through mutual descent from Oscar I of Sweden and Leopold, Grand Duke of Baden and fourth cousins once removed through Paul I of Russia. It was described as a love match.

=== Pre-wedding celebrations ===
In the week leading up to the wedding, numerous events were held in Stockholm to celebrate. The bride and groom's mutual cousin, Queen Astrid of Belgium, and her husband, King Leopold III, hosted a reception at the Belgian Embassy. On the evening of 22 May, the bride's grandfather, King Gustav V, held a dinner and concert for 800 guests at the Royal Palace and a second reception was held on the evening of 23 May followed by a gala performance at the Royal Swedish Opera.

== Wedding ==
The wedding took place in Stockholm Cathedral on 24 May 1935 and was officiated by the Archbishop of Uppsala, Erling Eidem.

=== Attire ===
Ingrid wore the veil of Irish lace that her late mother, Princess Margaret of Connaught, had worn at her wedding 30 years prior. The veil has since been worn by all of Ingrid's female descendants – as well as Mary Donaldson, the present Queen consort of Denmark. She wore a crown of myrtle from a shrub her mother had brought with her from Osborne House in England to Sofiero Palace in Sweden. Carrying a sprig of myrtle in your wedding bouquet is a tradition that is maintained to this day in the Swedish royal family and, with Ingrid, has continued into the Danish royal family when she brought cuttings from the shrub at Sofiero to be planted at Fredensborg Palace.

=== Attendants ===
Ingrid's second cousins Princess Ragnhild and Princess Astrid of Norway served as bridesmaids while Count Gustaf Bernadotte of Wisborg, son of Folke Bernadotte, was a ring bearer.

== Guests ==
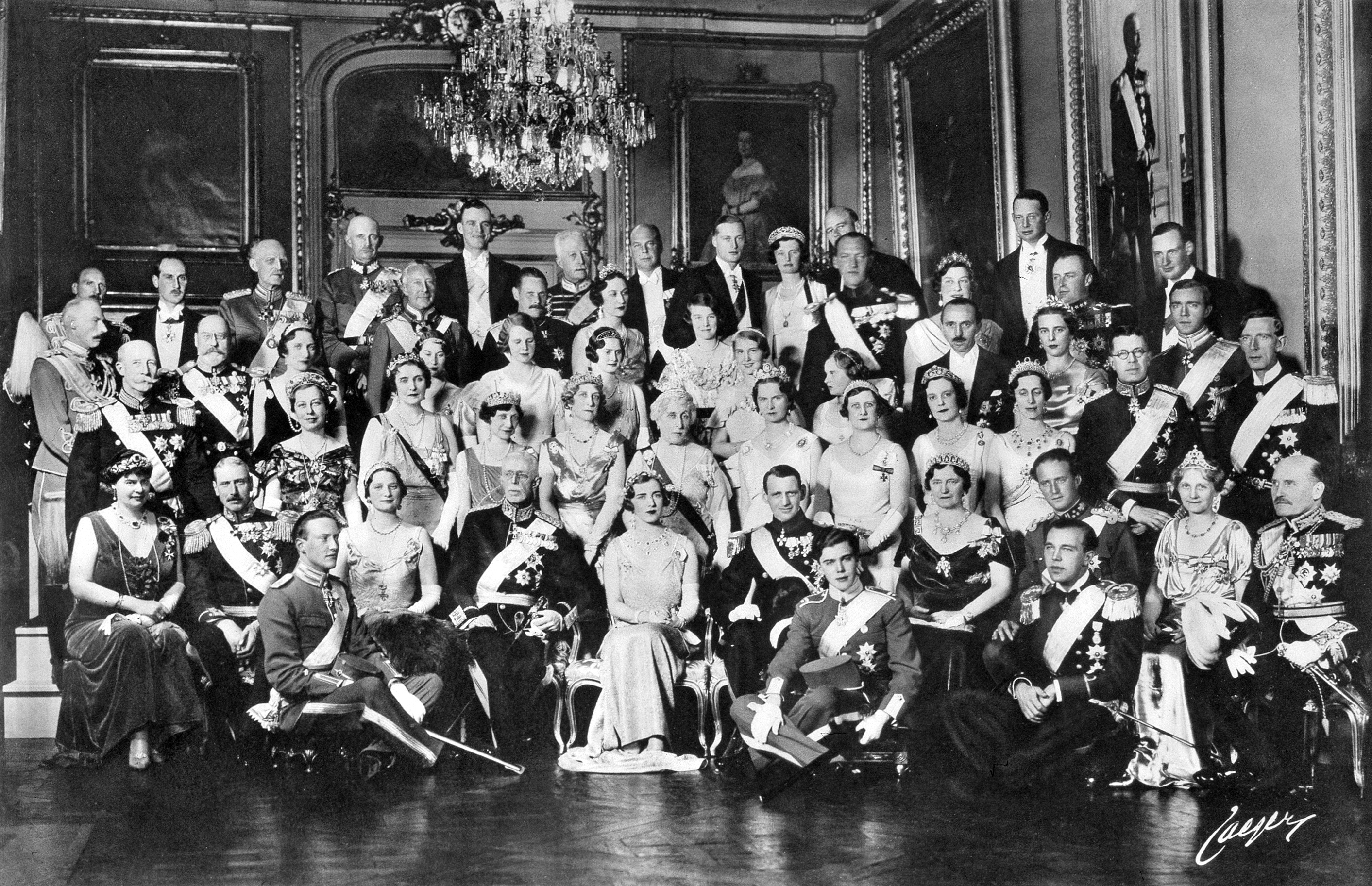
The royal guests at the wedding of Frederik and Ingrid

=== Relatives of the bride ===
- The King of Sweden, the bride's paternal grandfather
  - The Crown Prince and Crown Princess of Sweden, the bride's father and stepmother
    - The Duke and Duchess of Västerbotten, the bride's brother and sister-in-law
    - The Duke of Halland, the bride's brother
    - The Duke of Dalarna, the bride's brother
  - The Duke of Södermanland, the bride's paternal uncle
- The Duke of Närke, the bride's paternal granduncle
- Count and Countess Folke Bernadotte of Wisborg, the bride's paternal first cousin once removed and his wife
  - Count Gustaf Bernadotte of Wisborg, the bride's paternal second cousin
- Prince and Princess Arthur of Connaught, the bride's maternal uncle and aunt
- Lady Patricia Ramsay, the bride's maternal aunt
- Princess Helena Victoria, the bride's maternal first cousin once removed

=== Relatives of the groom ===
- The King and Queen of Denmark and Iceland, the groom's parents
- Prince Harald of Denmark, the groom's paternal uncle
  - Princess Feodora of Denmark, the groom's paternal first cousin
  - Princess Alexandrine-Louise of Denmark, the groom's paternal first cousin
- The Duchess and Duke of Västergötland, the groom's paternal aunt and uncle (also the bride's paternal granduncle and grandaunt)
  - Princess Margaretha and Prince Axel of Denmark, the groom's paternal first cousin (also the bride's first cousin once removed) and the groom's paternal first cousin once removed
  - The Crown Princess and Crown Prince of Norway, the groom's paternal first cousins (also the bride's paternal first cousin once removed and the bride's paternal second cousin) (representing the King of Norway)
    - Princess Ragnhild of Norway, the groom's double first cousin once removed (also the bride's paternal second cousin)
    - Princess Astrid of Norway, the groom's double first cousin once removed (also the bride's paternal second cousin)
  - The Queen and King of the Belgians, the groom's paternal first cousin (also the bride's paternal first cousin once removed) and her husband
  - The Duke of Östergötland, the groom's paternal first cousin (also the bride's paternal first cousin once removed)
- Princess Thyra of Denmark, the groom's paternal aunt
- Prince Gustav of Denmark, the groom's paternal uncle
- Princess Friedrich Sigismund of Prussia, the groom's paternal first cousin
- Prince Christian of Schaumburg-Lippe, the groom's paternal first cousin
- Prince George of Greece and Denmark, the groom's paternal first cousin once removed
  - Princess Eugénie of Greece and Denmark, the groom's paternal second cousin
- The Margrave and Margravine of Baden the groom's paternal second cousins (also the bride's step cousin and her husband)
- Prince Valdemar of Denmark, the groom's paternal granduncle
  - Prince Erik, Count of Rosenborg, the groom's paternal first cousin once removed
  - Prince Viggo, Count of Rosenborg, and Princess Viggo, Countess of Rosenborg, the groom's paternal first cousin once removed and his wife
  - Princess and Prince René of Bourbon-Parma, the groom's paternal first cousin once removed and her husband
- The Grand Duke and Grand Duchess of Mecklenburg-Schwerin, the groom's maternal uncle and aunt
  - The Hereditary Grand Duke of Mecklenburg-Schwerin, the groom's maternal first cousin
  - Duke Christian of Mecklenburg-Schwerin, the groom's maternal first cousin
  - Duchess Thyra of Mecklenburg-Schwerin, the groom's maternal first cousin
  - Duchess Anastasia of Mecklenburg-Schwerin, the groom's maternal first cousin
- The German Crown Princess and Crown Prince, the groom's maternal aunt and uncle
  - Prince Hubertus of Prussia, the groom's maternal first cousin
  - Prince Friedrich of Prussia, the groom's maternal first cousin
  - Princess Alexandrine of Prussia, the groom's maternal first cousin
  - Princess Cecilie of Prussia, the groom's maternal first cousin
