= Wedding of Prince Gustaf Adolf and Princess Margaret =

1905 royal wedding

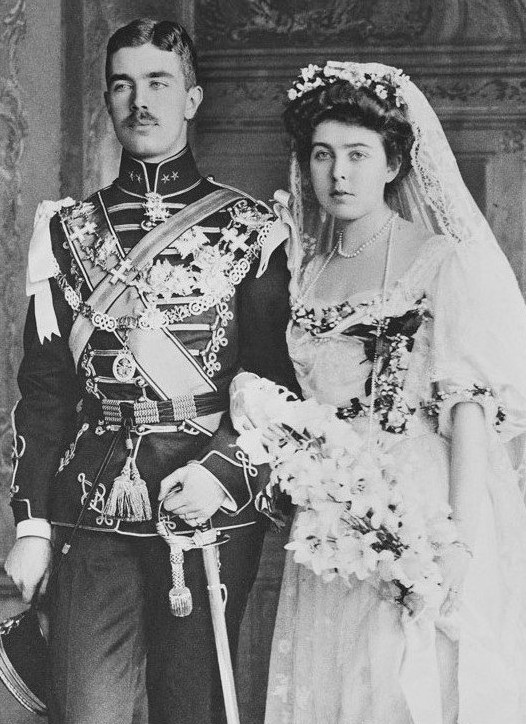
- Date: 15 June 1905; 121 years ago
- Venue: St George's Chapel, Windsor Castle
- Location: Windsor, Berkshire, England
- Participants: Prince Gustaf Adolf, Duke of Scania; Princess Margaret of Connaught

The wedding of Prince Gustaf Adolf of Sweden, Duke of Scania, and Princess Margaret of Connaught was held on Thursday, 15 June 1905, at St George's Chapel, Windsor Castle.

The groom was the eldest son of the Crown Prince and Crown Princess of Sweden (later King Gustaf V and Queen Victoria) while the bride was the elder daughter of the Duke and Duchess of Connaught and Strathearn and the niece of King Edward VII. The couple had met in Egypt earlier that year.

The ceremony was a traditional Church of England wedding service. Philip Eliot, Dean of Windsor, presided at the service and Randall Davidson, Archbishop of Canterbury, conducted the marriage. Guests included members of the British and Swedish royal families, foreign royal families, and dignitaries from both countries.

The couple remained married until Margaret died in 1920 during her sixth pregnancy. Gustaf Adolf remarried her first cousin once removed Lady Louise Mountbatten in 1923 and acceded to the Swedish throne as Gustaf VI Adolf in 1950. Their descendants today form the Swedish, Danish and Greek royal families.

== Engagement ==
In January 1905, Prince Arthur, Duke of Connaught and Strathearn, and his family, including his two daughters, 23-year-old Princess Margaret and 18-year-old Princess Patricia, visited Portugal. The princesses were considered the most eligible and beautiful in Europe and their uncle King Edward VII, hoped they would marry a foreign monarch or crown prince. The Connaughts hoped to match one of their daughters with Luís Filipe, Prince Royal of Portugal, but nothing came of the trip and they continued on to Egypt. At a ball held by Abbas II, Khedive of Egypt and Sudan, at Abdeen Palace, the family met Prince Gustaf Adolf of Sweden and Norway, Duke of Scania, grandson of King Oscar II of Sweden and Norway. Though considered a match for Patricia, Margaret and Gustaf Adolf fell in love at first sight.

After only a few meetings, Prince Gustaf Adolf proposed at a dinner held by the Earl of Cromer, Consul-General to Egypt, on 25 February 1905 at the British Consulate and Margaret accepted. The news came as a surprise in Sweden and the United Kingdom but was received with joy.

On 20 March 1905, King Edward VII granted his formal consent to the marriage pursuant to the Royal Marriages Act 1772. The announcement in The London Gazette read:

HIS MAJESTY was this day pleased to declare His Consent to a Contract of Matrimony between Her Royal Highness Princess Margaret Victoria Augusta Charlotte Norah of Connaught, elder daughter of Their Royal Highnesses The Duke and Duchess of Connaught and Strathearn, and His Royal Highness Prince Oscar Frederick William Olaf Gustavus Adolphus, Duke of Schonen [sic], eldest son of Their Royal Highnesses The Crown Prince and Crown Princess of Sweden and Norway, and grandson of Their Majesties The King and Queen of Sweden and Norway, which Consent His Majesty has caused to be signified under the Great Seal, and to be entered in the Books of the Privy Council.

== Wedding ==
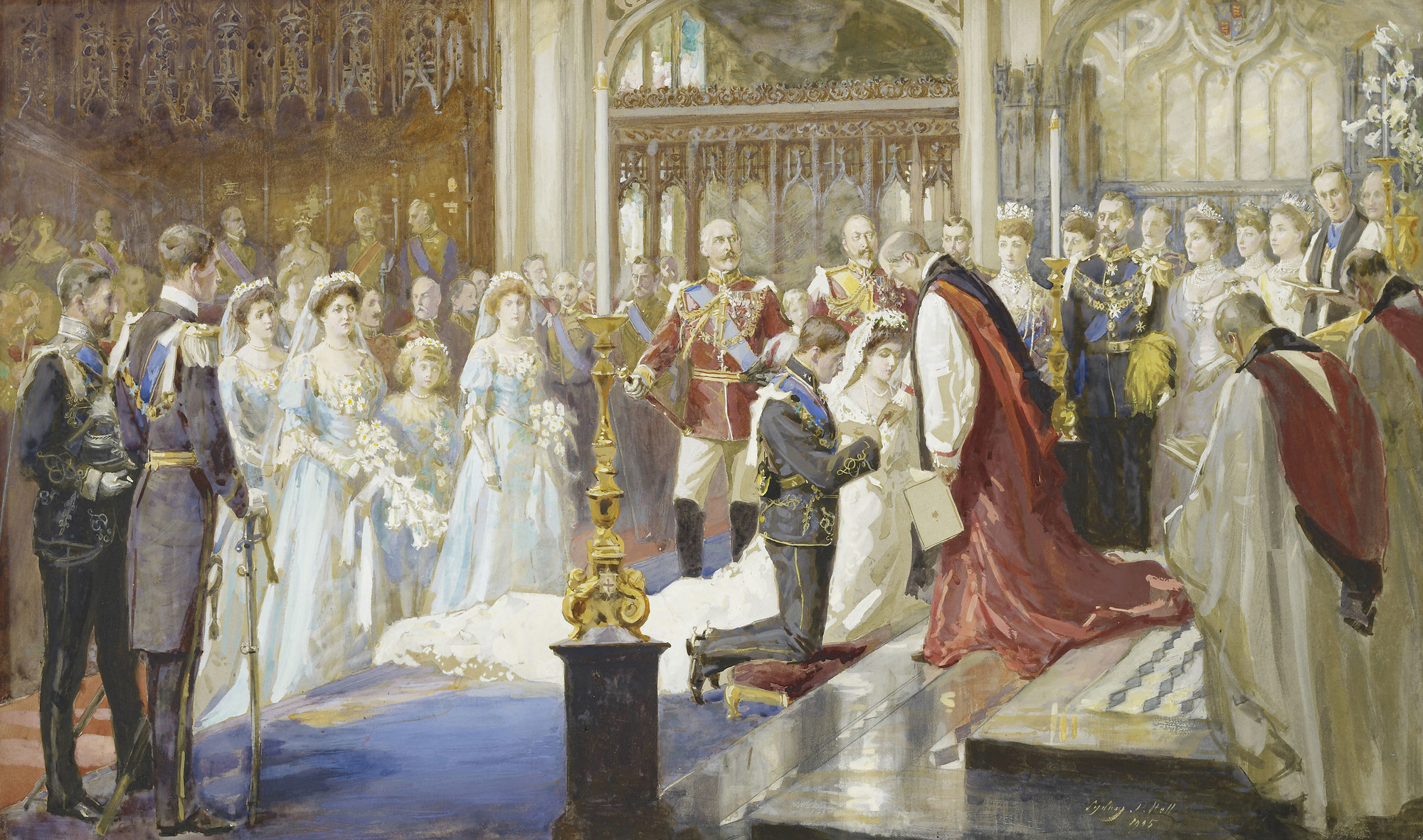
Marriage of Princess Margaret of Connaught to Prince Gustavus Adolphus of Sweden by Sydney Prior Hall (1905)

The wedding took place in St George's Chapel, Windsor Castle. It was a traditional Church of England marriage ceremony conducted according to the Book of Common Prayer. Philip Eliot, Dean of Windsor, presided at the service and Randall Davidson, Archbishop of Canterbury, conducted the marriage, assisted by Herbert Edward Ryle, Bishop of Winchester and Prelate of the Order of the Garter, and Francis Paget, Bishop of Oxford.

The bride was given in marriage by her father. After the service, the couple, the wedding party, and their families and guests returned to Windsor Castle where the register was signed in the White Drawing Room.

The wedding came just days after the dissolution of the union between Norway and Sweden was set into motion by a resolution of the Storting on 7 June 1905.

=== Luncheon ===
After the signing of the register, the King and Queen hosted a luncheon in honour of their niece and her groom. The couple and their families and royal guests dined in the State Dining Room while the other invited guests dined in St George's Hall.

The menu included Zèphires de Crabes á la Suédoise, named in honour of Sweden, and Chaufroix de Cailles à la Bernadotte, named after the Swedish House of Bernadotte. The five-foot-tall wedding cake featured figures bearing wheat, an element on the coat of arms of Sweden symbolizing the House of Vasa.

=== Honeymoon ===
The couple spent their wedding night at Saighton Grange in Cheshire. From Chester they travelled to Ireland for their honeymoon at Adare Manor in County Limerick, seat of the Earl of Dunraven and Mount-Earl.

=== Attendants ===
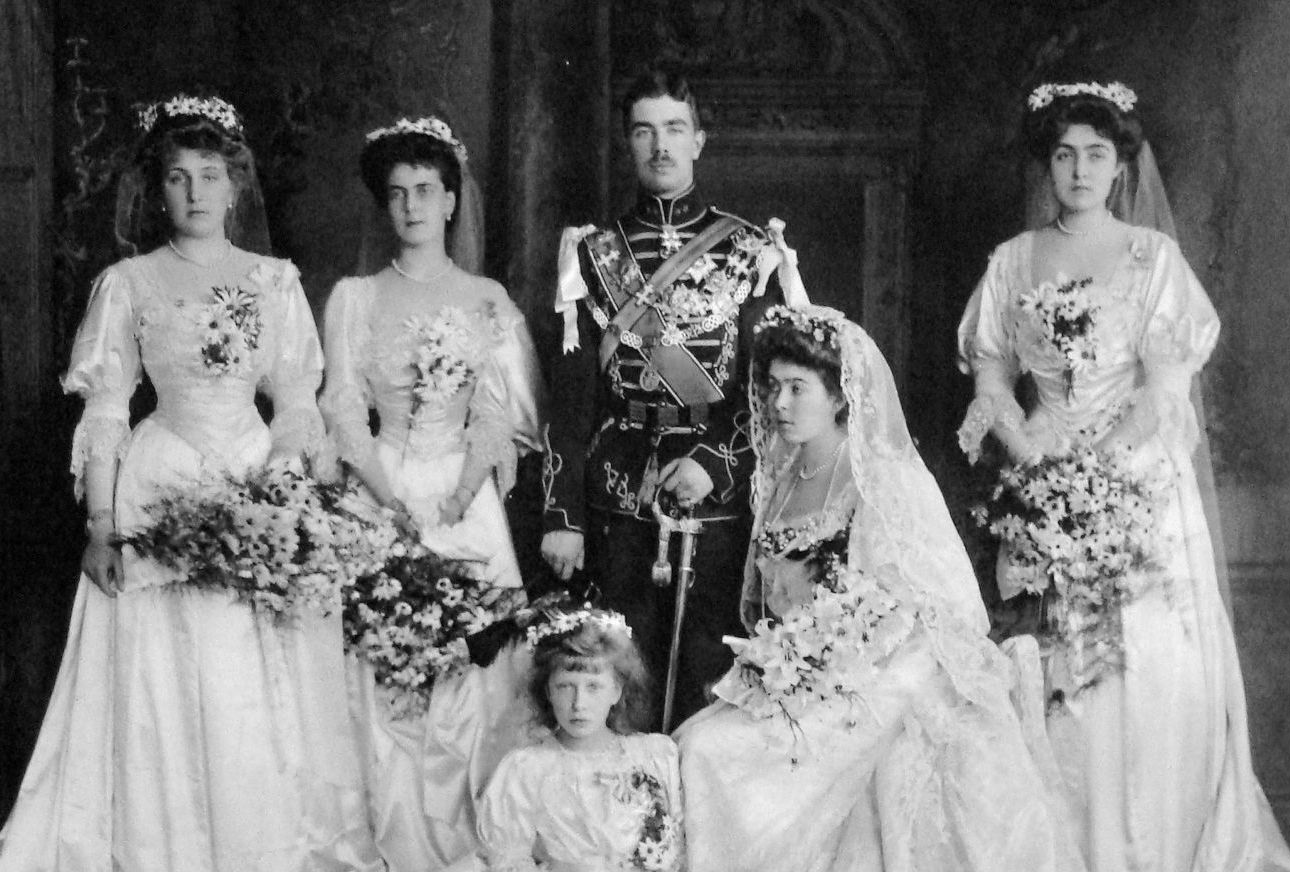
The bridal couple with the bridesmaids

Princess Margaret was attended by four bridesmaids, her sister, Princess Patricia of Connaught, and cousins, Princess Victoria Eugenie of Battenberg, Princess Beatrice of Saxe-Coburg and Gotha, and Princess Mary of Wales. Prince Gustaf Adolf's supporters were his brother, Prince Wilhelm, and his uncle, Prince Eugen.

=== Attire ===
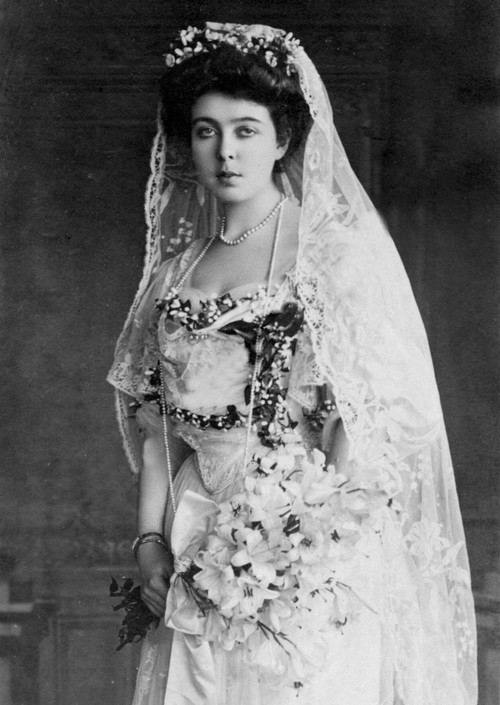
Princess Margaret's wedding gown

Princess Margaret wore a French-made white satin gown trimmed with orange blossom, myrtle and Irish lace. Her veil, a gift from the ladies of Ireland, later draped her coffin and was removed and given to her daughter Ingrid who wore it at her wedding in 1935. It has subsequently been worn by all of Margaret's female descendants and by her great-granddaughter-in-law, Queen Mary of Denmark. Margaret brought a sprig of myrtle trimmed from a bush planted by her grandmother Queen Victoria with her to Sweden and sprigs from that plant have been carried by every Swedish royal bride since.

Prince Gustaf Adolf wore full dress uniform with the collar and star of the Order of the Bath, the collar and star of the Order of the Seraphim, the riband and star of the Order of the Sword and the neck badge of the Order of the Polar Star.

=== Gifts ===
The couple received a large number of presents which were displayed at Clarence House, the bride's parent's home. Margaret received several jewels, including two tiaras now in the Swedish royal collection and one by Cartier which now belongs to her granddaughter Queen Anne-Marie of Greece and has been worn by almost all her female descendants on their wedding days. The Duke and Duchess of Devonshire sent a turquoise and diamond brooch now worn by Queen Margrethe II of Denmark. Queen Sofia presented her grandson's bride with a laurel wreath necklace by Boucheron now worn as a tiara by Crown Princess Victoria. King Oscar II gifted the couple Sofiero Palace which became their summer residence.

==== Exchange of honours ====
On the occasion of the marriage, King Edward VII made Gustaf Adolf's father, Crown Prince Gustaf, a knight of the Order of the Garter. He also made Gustaf Adolf an honorary knight grand cross of both the Order of the Bath and the Royal Victorian Order. Gustaf Adolf's brother, Prince Wilhelm, paternal uncle, Prince Eugen, maternal uncle, the Hereditary Grand Duke of Baden, and other Swedish courtiers were also appointed to the Royal Victorian Order. The Khedive, in whose country the couple met, was granted the Royal Victorian Chain.

Gustaf Adolf's grandfather, King Oscar II, made the Prince of Wales and Prince Arthur of Connaught, Margaret's brother, knights of the Order of the Seraphim. Her father, who had had the Seraphim since 1873, was granted the Order of Charles XIII.

=== Film ===
Cecil Hepworth made a short documentary film of the wedding titled The Royal Wedding at Windsor.

== Aftermath ==
The Duke and new Duchess of Scania arrived in Sweden on 8 July 1905 and took up residence in the Royal Palace of Stockholm and Sofiero Palace. The couple had five children: Gustaf Adolf (1906–1947); Sigvard (1907–2002); Ingrid (1910–2000); Bertil (1912–1997); and Carl Johan (1916–2012). Carl Johan was the last surviving great-grandchild of Queen Victoria of the United Kingdom.

They remained married until Margaret died of sepsis on 1 May 1920 at the age of 38. She was eight months into her sixth pregnancy. In 1923, Gustaf Adolf, by then Crown Prince of Sweden, remarried Margaret's first cousin once removed Lady Louise Mountbatten. He acceded to the Swedish throne as Gustaf VI Adolf in 1950 and died in 1973.

Their descendants today sit on the Swedish and Danish thrones and head the former dynasties of Greece and Sayn-Wittgenstein-Berleburg. Many wedding traditions in these royal families, such as the use of myrtle in bouquets, Margaret's Irish lace veil and the Khedive of Egypt tiara have their origins at this wedding.

== See also ==
- List of royal weddings
- Wedding of Frederik, Crown Prince of Denmark, and Princess Ingrid of Sweden
