= Princess Alexandrine of Prussia =

Princess Alexandrine of Prussia may refer to:

- Princess Alexandrine of Prussia (1803–1892), daughter of Frederick William III of Prussia
- Princess Alexandrine of Prussia (1842–1906), daughter of Prince Albert of Prussia
- Princess Alexandrine of Prussia (1915–1980), daughter of Wilhelm, German Crown Prince
