= Duchess Cecilie of Mecklenburg-Schwerin =

German and Prussian Crown Princess (1886–1954)

Cecilie of Mecklenburg-Schwerin
- German Crown Princess; Crown Princess of Prussia
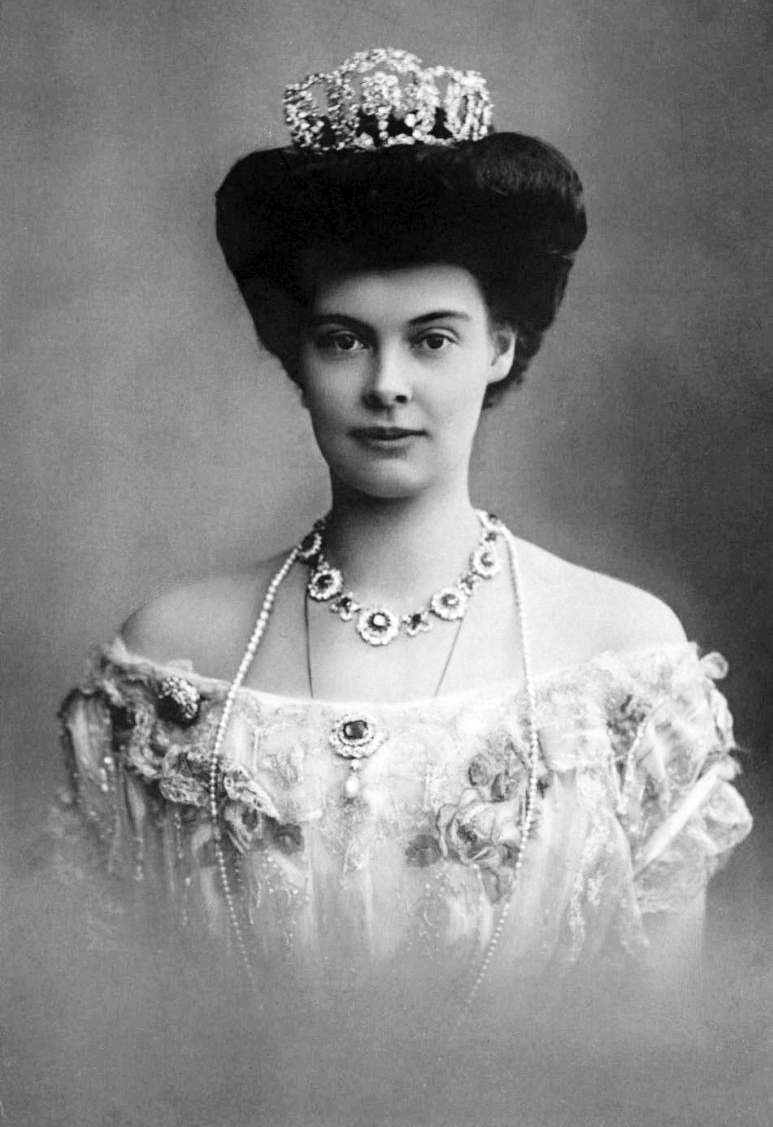
- Cecilie in c. 1905

Consort of the Head of the House of Hohenzollern Princess of Prussia
- Tenure: 4 June 1941 – 20 July 1951
- Born: 20 September 1886; Schwerin, Mecklenburg-Schwerin, German Empire
- Died: 6 May 1954 (aged 67); Bad Kissingen, Bavaria, West Germany
- Burial: 12 May 1954; Hohenzollern Castle, Baden-Württemberg, West Germany
- Spouse: Wilhelm, German Crown Prince (m. 1905; died 1951)
- Issue: Prince Wilhelm; Louis Ferdinand, Prince of Prussia; Prince Hubertus; Prince Friedrich; Princess Alexandrine; Princess Cecilie
Names
- Cecilie Auguste Marie
- House: Mecklenburg-Schwerin
- Father: Frederick Francis III, Grand Duke of Mecklenburg-Schwerin
- Mother: Grand Duchess Anastasia Mikhailovna of Russia

Duchess Cecilie Auguste Marie of Mecklenburg-Schwerin (20 September 1886 – 6 May 1954) was the last German Crown Princess and Crown Princess of Prussia as the wife of Wilhelm, German Crown Prince, the son of Wilhelm II, German Emperor.

Cecilie was a daughter of Frederick Francis III, Grand Duke of Mecklenburg-Schwerin and Grand Duchess Anastasia Mikhailovna of Russia. She was brought up with simplicity, and her early life was peripatetic, spending summers in Mecklenburg and the rest of the year in Southern France. After the death of her father, she traveled every summer between 1898 and 1904 to her mother's native Russia. On 6 June 1905, she married German Crown Prince Wilhelm. The couple had four sons and two daughters. Cecilie, tall and statuesque, became popular in Germany for her sense of style. However, her husband was a womanizer and the marriage was unhappy.

After the fall of the German monarchy, at the end of World War I, Cecilie and her husband lived mostly apart. During the Weimar Republic and the Nazi period, Cecilie lived a private life mainly at Cecilienhof Palace in Potsdam. With the advance of the Soviet troops, she left the Cecilienhof in February 1945, never to return. She settled in Bad Kissingen until 1952 when she moved to an apartment in the Frauenkopf district of Stuttgart. In 1952, she published a book of memoirs. She died two years later.

== Early years ==
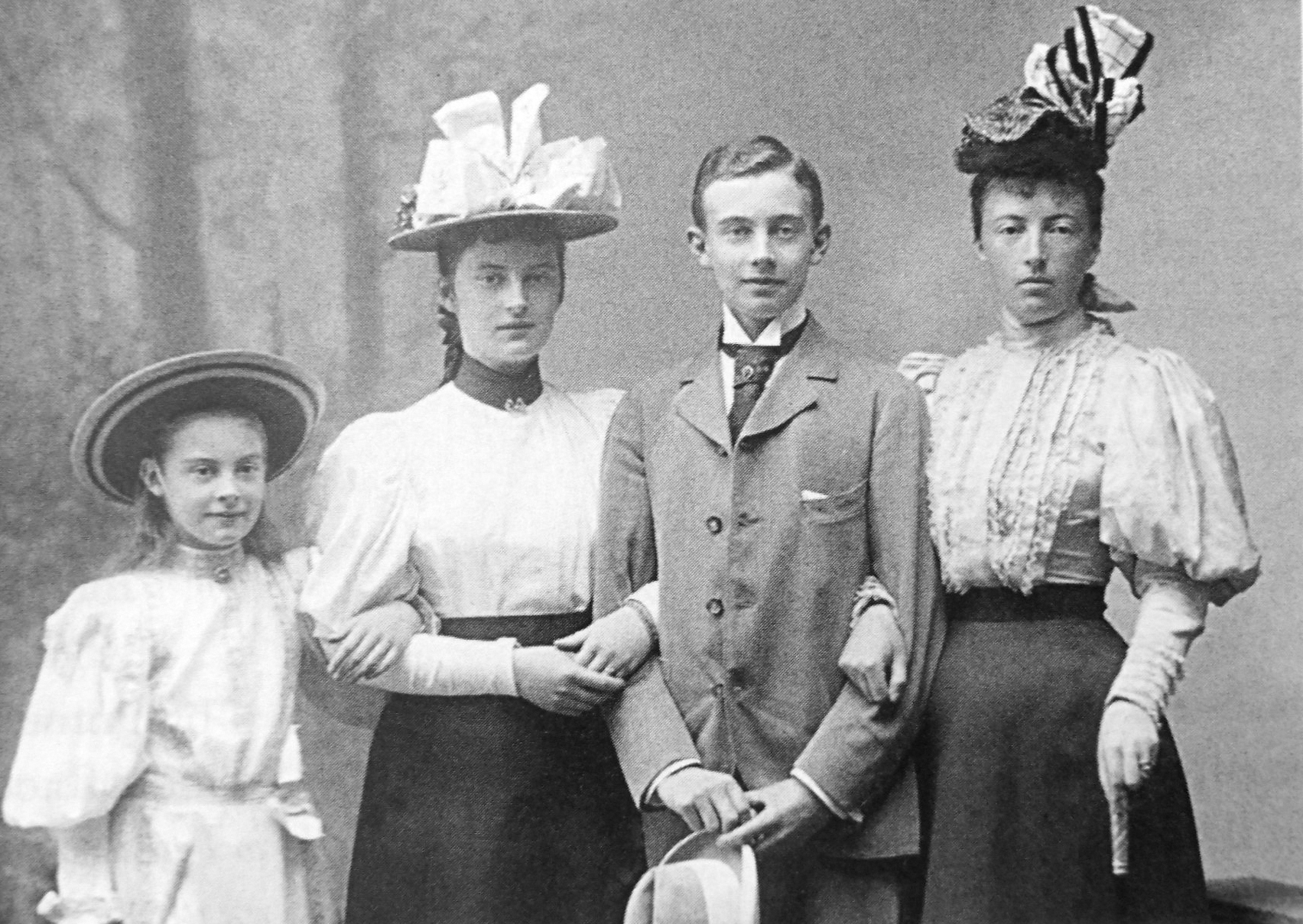
Cecilie, Alexandrine and Friedrich Franz of Mecklenburg-Schwerin with their mother Grand Duchess Anastasia.

Born on 20 September 1886 in Schwerin, Cecilie was the youngest daughter of Frederick Francis III, Grand Duke of Mecklenburg-Schwerin and Grand Duchess Anastasia Mikhailovna of Russia. She was named after her maternal grandmother, Princess Cecilie of Baden. She spent most of her childhood in Schwerin, at the royal residences of Ludwigslust Palace and the Gelbensande hunting lodge, only a few kilometres from the Baltic Sea coast. Her father suffered badly from asthma and the wet damp cold climate of Mecklenburg was not good for his health. As a result, Cecilie spent a large amount of time with her family in Cannes in the south of France, favoured at the time by European royalty, including some whom Cecilie met such as Empress Eugénie and her future husband's great-uncle, Edward VII.

During the winter visit of 1897, Cecilie's sister, Alexandrine, met her future husband, Crown Prince Christian, later Christian X of Denmark, shortly before the death of their father at the age of 46. After returning to Schwerin, Cecilie spent time with her widowed mother in Denmark. The wedding of her sister took place in Cannes in April 1898. After the death of her father, she traveled every summer, from 1898 to 1904, visiting her relatives in Russia. Cecilie lived there in Mikhailovskoe on Kronstadt Bay, the country home of her maternal grandfather, Grand Duke Michael Nikolaevich of Russia.

== Engagement ==
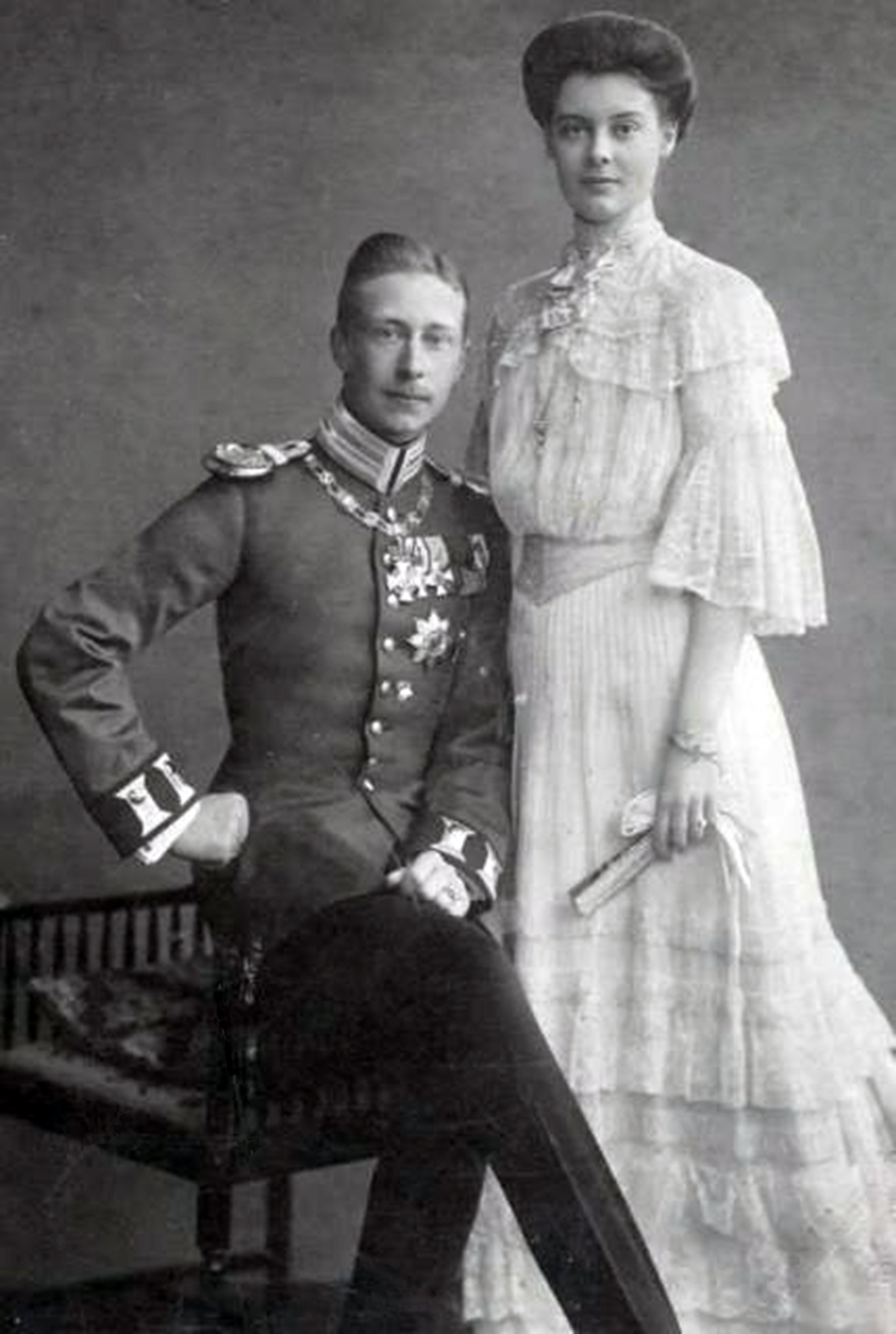
Duchess Cecilie of Mecklenburg-Schwerin and Wilhelm, Crown Prince of Germany in 1905.

During the wedding festivities of her brother Frederick Francis IV, Grand Duke of Mecklenburg-Schwerin in Schwerin in June 1904, the 17-year-old Duchess Cecilie got to know her future husband, Wilhelm, German Crown Prince. Kaiser Wilhelm II had sent his eldest son to the festivities as his personal representative. Taller than most women of her time at 182 centimetres (over 5'11"), Cecilie was as tall as the German Crown Prince. Wilhelm was struck by her great beauty, and her dark hair and eyes. On 4 September 1904, the young couple celebrated their engagement at the Mecklenburg-Schwerin hunting lodge, Gelbensande. The kaiser as an engagement present had a wooden residence built nearby for the couple. On 5 September the first official photos of the couple were taken.

== Wedding ==
The wedding of Duchess Cecilie of Mecklenburg-Schwerin and the German Crown Prince Wilhelm took place on 6 June 1905 in Berlin. Arriving from Schwerin at Berlin's Lehrter Station, the future Crown Princess was greeted on the platform with a gift of dark red roses. She was greeted at Bellevue Palace by the entire German imperial family and later made a joyeuse entrée through the Brandenburg Gate to a gun salute in the Tiergarten. Crowds lined the sides of the Unter den Linden as she passed on the way to the Berlin Palace. Kaiser Wilhelm II greeted her at the palace and conducted her to the Knight's Hall where over fifty guests from different European royal houses awaited the young bride including Grand Duke Michael Alexandrovich of Russia, Archduke Franz Ferdinand, as well as representatives from Denmark, Italy, Belgium, Portugal and the Netherlands. On her wedding day, Kaiser Wilhelm II presented his daughter-in-law with the Order of Louise.

The wedding ceremony took place in the Royal Chapel and also the nearby Berlin Cathedral. The royal couple received as wedding presents jewellery, silverware and porcelain. At the wish of the bride, Richard Wagner's famous wedding march from Lohengrin was played along with music from Die Meistersinger von Nürnberg conducted by Richard Strauss. On her wedding day, Duchess Cecilie of Mecklenburg-Schwerin became Her Imperial and Royal Highness The German Crown Princess and Crown Princess of Prussia. She was expected to one day become German empress and queen of Prussia.

== German Crown Princess ==
As German crown princess, Cecilie quickly became one of the most beloved members of the German imperial house. She was known for her elegance and fashion consciousness. It was not long before her fashion style was copied by many women throughout the German Empire. After the end of the wedding festivities, the crown princely couple made their summer residence at the Marble Palace in Potsdam. Every year at the beginning of the court season in January, the couple would return to the Crown Prince Palace in Berlin on Unter den Linden. Cecilie's first child was born on 4 July 1906 and given the traditional Hohenzollern name of Wilhelm. At the time, the German monarchy appeared to be very secure.

Nonetheless in private she had a fiery temper, not countenancing contradiction. Although in public the marriage of the crown prince and princess appeared to be perfect, cracks quickly appeared due to the crown prince's wandering eye and controlling behaviour. Very early on, he began a series of affairs that strained the relationship between husband and wife - on one occasion announcing to his wife his latest escapade, whereupon she thought of drowning herself.

In spite of her husband's unfaithfulness, however, Cecilie had given birth to six children by 1917. They were:

- Prince Wilhelm of Prussia (1906–1940); married Dorothea von Salviati, had issue.
- Prince Louis Ferdinand of Prussia, Head of the House of Hohenzollern (1907–1994); married Kira Kirillovna of Russia, had issue.
- Prince Hubertus of Prussia (1909–1950); married Baroness Maria von Humboldt-Dachroeden, no issue; married Princess Magdalena Reuss of Köstritz, had issue.
- Prince Friedrich Georg of Prussia (1911–1966); married Lady Brigid Guinness, had issue.
- Princess Alexandrine of Prussia (1915–1980), who had Down syndrome.
- Princess Cecilie of Prussia (1917–1975); married American architect Clyde Kenneth Harris, had issue.

She herself developed a passionate relationship with Baron Otto von Dungern (1873-1969), her husband's aide de camp - attempting, once, to get into bed with Dungern. On discovering that Dungern was also having an affair with another woman at court, she confessed to her husband who told him to resign with the words: "Only my consideration for his imperial majesty (his father, Kaiser William II) prevents me from grinding you into the dust."

== Impact as German Crown Princess ==
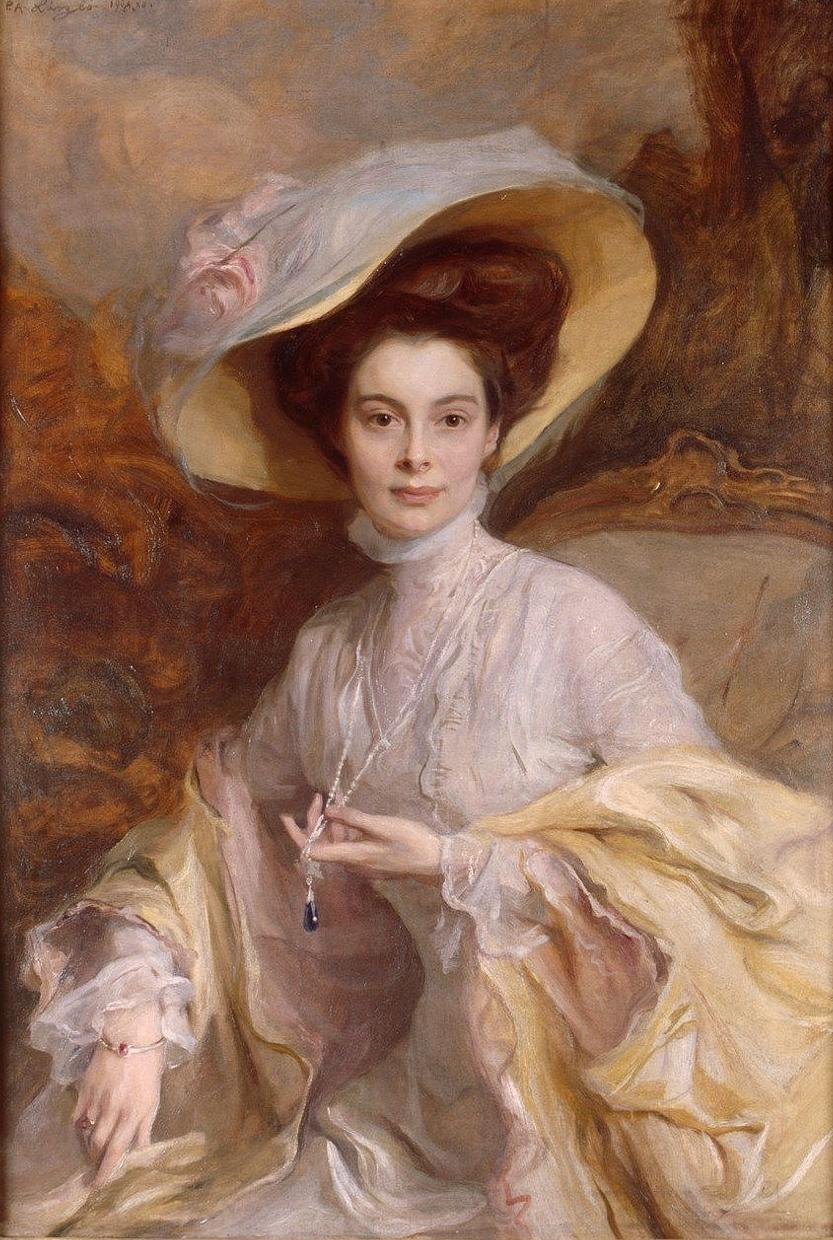
Crown Princess Cecilie (1906), by Philip de László

Cecilie made considerable impact in a number of areas including women's education. Several schools and roads were named after her. On 6 December 1906, at AG Vulcan Stettin's shipyard, she christened the Norddeutscher Lloyd steamship SS Kronprinzessin Cecilie. For Cecilie, who had a great passion for the sea since childhood, the gesture brought her great joy and honour. Towards the end of 1910, the couple undertook a tour to Ceylon, India, and Egypt. Cecilie's life in Berlin was a constant round of royal duties: attending military parades, gala state banquets, official ceremonies, and other courtly activities. She also made state visits to foreign courts, such as the Austrian Emperor Franz Josef in Vienna. In May 1911, Cecilie and the crown prince visited the Russian imperial court in Saint Petersburg. The visit coincided with the birthday of the Russian tsar. In June 1911, they attended the coronation of King George V and Queen Mary in London. A British illustrated magazine, The Sphere, called them "our beloved visitors for the coronation". Queen Mary was particularly fond of the imperial couple and maintained contact with Cecilie until her death in 1953. The 1911 visit to London was Cecilie's last as representative of the German Empire.

== Revolution and the overthrow of the German monarchy ==
The political and economic situation in the last year of the war became more and more hopeless. On 6 November 1918, the new German imperial Chancellor, Prince Maximilian of Baden, met with Minister Wilhelm Solf to discuss the future of the German Empire. They were both of the opinion that the monarchy could only survive with the removal of the kaiser and his son the crown prince and the setting up of a regency under the nominal rule of the young son of Crown Princess Cecilie. Such an idea quickly disappeared with Friedrich Ebert becoming chancellor and a republic being declared a few days later. Both the kaiser and the crown prince crossed the border to seek exile in the neutral Netherlands. The monarchy collapsed with the defeat of Germany at the end of the war. Cecilie with her young children was living in Potsdam during the revolutionary period. She had moved from her new home of Cecilienhof with her children to join her mother-in-law in the relative safety of the New Palace. It was here that the Empress Auguste Viktoria informed her daughter-in-law, "The revolution has broken out. The kaiser has abdicated. The war is lost."

== Life under the republic ==
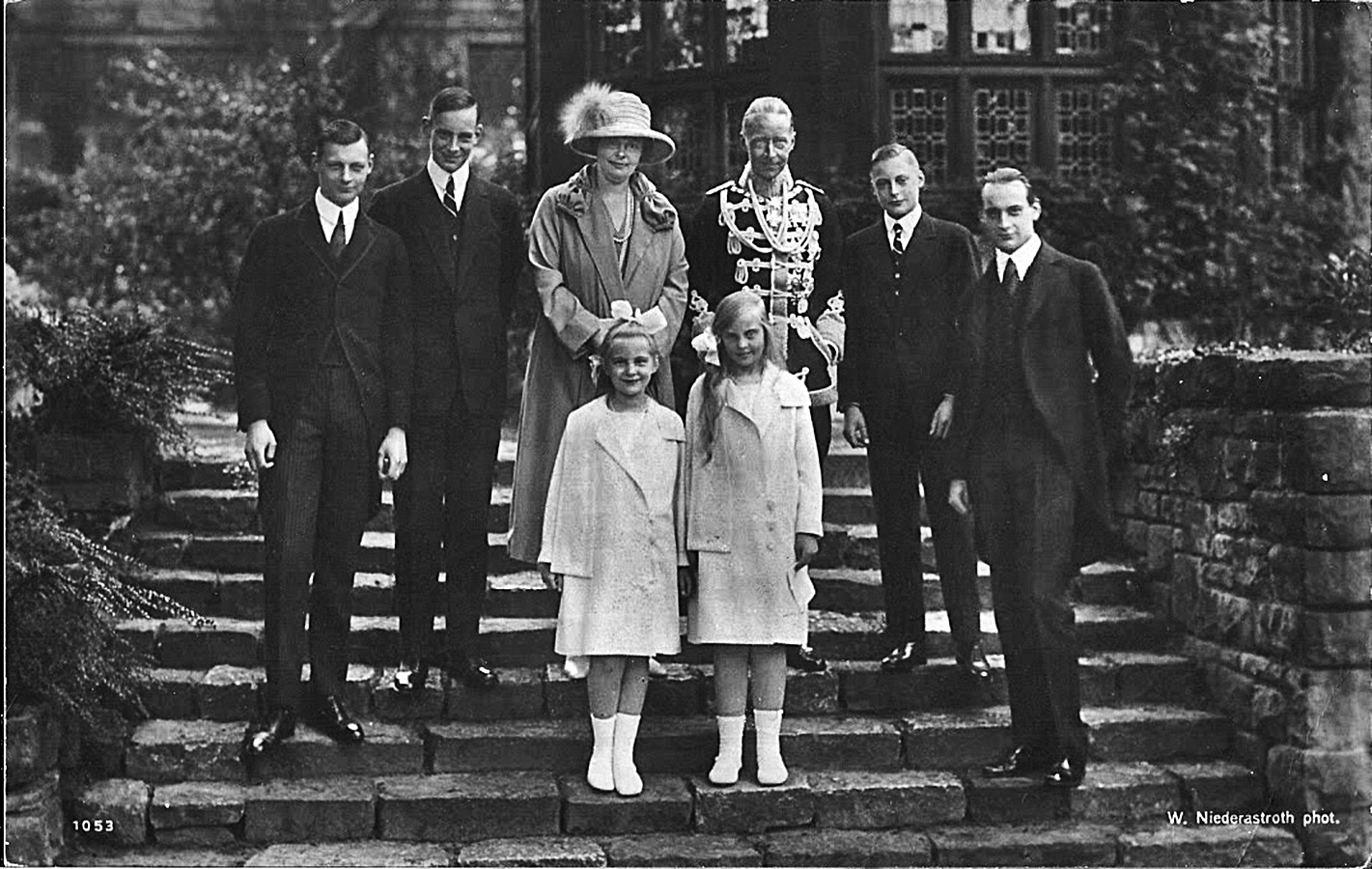
The German Crown Prince with his wife and their children, circa 1925. From left to right: Prince Wilhelm, Prince Hubertus, Crown Princess Cecilie, Crown Prince Wilhelm, Prince Friedrich Georg and Prince Louis Ferdinand of Prussia. In the foreground: Princesses Alexandrine and Cecilie of Prussia.

The former crown princess was nothing but realistic about the new political situation confronting her family and Germany. The former empress went into exile to join her husband. The crown princess was quite prepared to do the same, but wanted to stay in Germany with her children if at all possible. This she was allowed to do and on 14 November, she quietly left the New Palace and returned to her private home of Cecilienhof. As a result of a change of circumstances, Cecilie reduced her household staff by 50%. Her children's tutor also left her service and as a result her two eldest sons, Princes Wilhelm and Louis Ferdinand, for the first time attended as day students at a nearby school. Cecilie had considerable sympathy for the plight of the German people. In reply to an address from the German Women's Union in Berlin, the former crown princess stated, "I need no sympathy. I have the beautiful situation that can befall any German woman, the education of my children as good German citizens."

Wilhelm was only allowed to return to Germany from his enforced exile in 1923. Before then visits to him were difficult. Fortunately for the Hohenzollern family they still possessed considerable private holdings in Germany due to a provisional agreement worked out between the Hohenzollern family and the Prussian state in November 1920. Castle Oels, a castle with 10,000 hectares of workable land in Silesia, now in modern day Poland, provided substantial income for Cecilie's family. In the absence of her husband, Cecilie became the leading figure in the once ruling House of Hohenzollern. The former crown princess was under no illusions that the empire would be restored, unlike her father-in-law exiled in Doorn in the Netherlands. His return was completely impossible. With the election of Gustav Stresemann as chancellor of the Weimar Republic in August 1923, negotiations for the former crown prince commenced. On the evening of 13 November 1923, Cecilie met her husband at Castle Oels. The years of separation and the behavior of Wilhelm had made the marriage now merely one in name only, but Cecilie was determined to keep things together even at a distance. More and more she lived in Cecilienhof at Potsdam, while her husband lived in Silesia. The couple would come together when necessary for the sake of family unity for occasions such as family weddings, confirmation of children, christenings and funerals. In 1927, a final financial agreement was reached between the Hohenzollerns and the Prussian state. Cecilie remained active within several charity organizations such as the Queen Louise Fund, Chair of the Fatherland's Women Union and the Ladies of the Order of St. John, while keeping clear of any political involvement. With the coming to power of the Nazi Party of Adolf Hitler in 1933, all such charitable organizations were dissolved.

== Under Nazi rule 1933–1939 ==
During 1933–1945, Cecilie lived a private life at Cecilienhof. Her eldest son Wilhelm forfeited his position as possible heir when he married Dorothea von Salviati on 3 June 1933. This occurred as she was not from a suitable royal family. Even though the royal house was formally deposed, its strict house rules persisted. The former crown prince and princess were more understanding of their son than the exiled kaiser. Cecilie was not perturbed and made the best of the situation and was delighted when she became a grandmother for the first time on 7 June 1934. In 1935, Cecilie's second son worked, after studying economics and working for a time in the United States as a mechanic for Ford Motor Company, then with Lufthansa. Her third son, Hubertus, after spending a period of time farming joined the military and then the air force to become a pilot. The youngest son Friedrich went into business. In May 1938, Prince Louis Ferdinand married Grand Duchess Kira Kirillovna of Russia, daughter of the pretender to the Russian throne, Grand Duke Cyril Vladimirovich, at Cecilienhof. It would be the last great family occasion before the outbreak of war in September 1939.

== World War II ==
A period of relative calm for Cecilie's family and for Germany came to an end with the outbreak of World War II in September 1939. Cecilie's 24-year-old nephew, Prince Oskar, fell as a casualty five days after the start of the invasion of Poland. More personal tragedy occurred when Wilhelm was mortally wounded in battle at Valenciennes in France on 23 May 1940. He died on 26 May in a field hospital at Nivelle. His funeral took place in the Church of Peace at Potsdam on 29 May. Over 50,000 people lined the way to his final resting place in the Antique Temple near the remains of his grandmother, former Empress Auguste Viktoria. The huge turnout in respect for a prince, who had died a hero's death, from the former ruling dynasty, alarmed and infuriated Adolf Hitler. As a result, no prince from a former German dynasty was allowed to serve at the front and in 1943 Hitler ordered that they all be discharged from the armed forces.

In 1941, the former Kaiser Wilhelm II died. At the age of 55, Cecilie's husband became Head of the House of Hohenzollern. While under the monarchy this would have meant a great change for Cecilie and her husband, the change was potentially dangerous because of the leader of the Nazi German state. During this time, Cecilie and her husband increasingly retreated to Castle Oels to live a quiet life, far away from the dangers of Berlin. Even Potsdam, only 30 minutes away by train from the capital was too close for comfort. With the war going badly, Cecilie and her family left the advancing danger of the Soviet Army to return to Potsdam where they celebrated Christmas in December 1944. It would be the last such occasion at her beloved home. In February 1945, Cecilie left Cecilienhof for the last time.

== Final years ==
Cecilie fled the Soviet Army in February 1945 to the sanatorium of Dr. Paul Sotier (personal physician of Kaiser Wilhelm II) Fürstenhof in Bad Kissingen in Bavaria. On 20 September 1946, she celebrated her 60th birthday. She was joined on this occasion by her husband and some of their children. Wilhelm had settled into a small house in Hechingen. Tragedy struck again when yet another son, Hubertus, died from appendicitis on 8 April 1950. In early 1951, the health of the former Crown Prince deteriorated and on 20 July he died. On 26 July, his funeral took place at Castle Hohenzollern where he was buried in the ground near an urn containing the ashes of the late Hubertus. On the arm of her son, Louis Ferdinand, Cecilie bade a final farewell to her husband. She remained in Bad Kissingen until 1952 when she moved to an apartment in the Frauenkopf district of Stuttgart.

In 1952, Cecilie's memoirs, Remembrances were published. In an act of healing and friendship, the former Crown Princess Cecilie was received by King George V's widow, Queen Mary, in May 1952 during a visit to England. Cecilie visited for the first time to attend the christening of her granddaughter, Princess Victoria Marina of Prussia, the daughter of her son Frederick. Tragedy once again struck when Cecilie's sister, the Danish Queen Mother, Queen Alexandrine, died on 28 December of the same year. On 3 January 1953, Cecilie attended her funeral at Roskilde Cathedral in Denmark. From this time on, the former crown princess never fully recovered. She managed to struggle on with the help of her family until 6 May 1954 when she died on a visit to Bad Kissingen. It was the 72nd birthday of her late husband. On 12 May 1954, her funeral took place and her remains were interred next to Crown Prince Wilhelm in the grounds of Castle Hohenzollern.

== Ancestry ==
Ancestors of Duchess Cecilie of Mecklenburg-Schwerin

8. Paul Frederick, Grand Duke of Mecklenburg-Schwerin
4. Frederick Francis II, Grand Duke of Mecklenburg-Schwerin
9. Princess Alexandrine of Prussia
2. Frederick Francis III, Grand Duke of Mecklenburg-Schwerin
10. Heinrich LXIII, Prince Reuss of Köstritz
5. Princess Augusta Reuss of Köstritz
11. Countess Eleonore of Stolberg-Wernigerode
1. Duchess Cecilie of Mecklenburg-Schwerin
12. Nicholas I of Russia
6. Grand Duke Michael Nikolaevich of Russia
13. Princess Charlotte of Prussia
3. Grand Duchess Anastasia Mikhailovna of Russia
14. Leopold, Grand Duke of Baden
7. Princess Cecilie of Baden
15. Princess Sophie of Sweden

== Works ==
- Memoirs (1931)

== Sources ==
- Cecilie, Crown Princess of Germany, 'My Memories of Imperial Russia', Royal Russia, No. 10, 2016. ISBN 978-1-927604-20-5
- Easton, Laird M., ed. and trans., Journey to the Abyss: The Diaries of Count Harry Kessler 1880–1918, New York, Vintage Books, 2013. ISBN 978-0-307-27843-2
- Kirschstein, Joerg, Kronprinzessin Cecilie: Eine Bildbiographie, Berlin, Quintessenz Verlags GmbH, 2004. ISBN 3-86124-579-5
- Zeepvat, Charlotte, 'The Other Anastasia: A Woman who Loved and Who Lived', Royalty Digest Quarterly, No. 2, 2006. ISSN 1653-5219

Duchess Cecilie of Mecklenburg-Schwerin House of Mecklenburg-Schwerin Cadet branch of the House of Mecklenburg Born: 20 September 1886 Died: 6 May 1954
Titles in pretence
Preceded by Hermine Reuss of Greiz	— TITULAR — German Empress; Queen of Prussia; 4 June 1941 – 20 July 1951; Reason for succession failure: German monarchies abolished in 1918	Succeeded by Grand Duchess Kira Kirillovna of Russia
