= Wilhelm, German Crown Prince =

Last German crown prince (1882–1951)

Wilhelm
- German Crown Prince; Crown Prince of Prussia
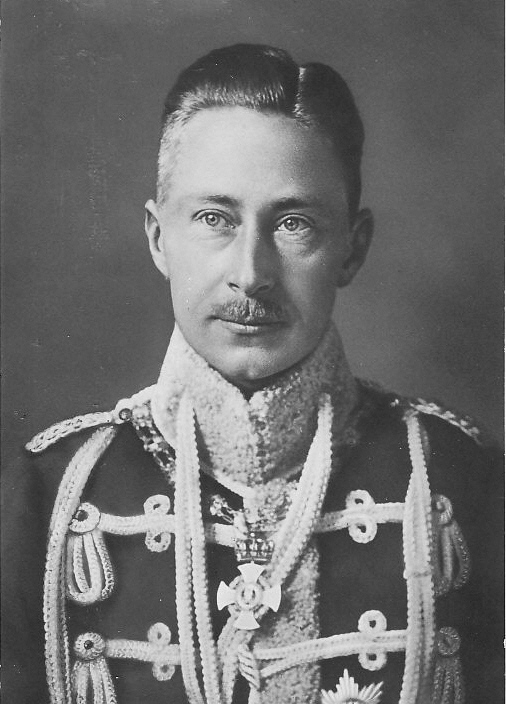
- Crown Prince Wilhelm, c. 1913

Head of the House of Hohenzollern Prince of Prussia
- Tenure: 4 June 1941 – 20 July 1951
- Predecessor: Wilhelm II
- Successor: Louis Ferdinand
- Born: 6 May 1882; Marmorpalais, Potsdam, Germany
- Died: 20 July 1951 (aged 69); Hechingen, West Germany
- Burial: 26 July 1951; Hohenzollern Castle, Germany
- Spouse: Duchess Cecilie of Mecklenburg-Schwerin (m. 1905)
- Issue: Prince Wilhelm; Louis Ferdinand, Prince of Prussia; Prince Hubertus; Prince Friedrich; Princess Alexandrine; Princess Cecilie
Names
- Friedrich Wilhelm Victor August Ernst
- House: Hohenzollern
- Father: Wilhelm II, German Emperor
- Mother: Augusta Victoria of Schleswig-Holstein
- Religion: Lutheranism (Prussian United)

Wilhelm, German Crown Prince, Crown Prince of Prussia (Friedrich Wilhelm Victor August Ernst; 6 May 1882 – 20 July 1951), was the eldest child of the last German emperor, Wilhelm II, and his consort Augusta Victoria of Schleswig-Holstein. As Emperor Wilhelm's heir, he was the last German Crown Prince and Crown Prince of Prussia, until the abolition of the monarchy.

Wilhelm became crown prince at the age of six in 1888, when his grandfather Frederick III died and his father became emperor. He was crown prince for 30 years until his father's abdication and the fall of the empire on 9 November 1918. During World War I, he commanded the 5th Army from 1914 to 1916 and was commander of the Army Group German Crown Prince for the remainder of the war. After his return to Germany in 1923, he fought the Weimar Republic and campaigned for the reintroduction of the monarchy in Germany. After his plans to become President had been blocked by his father, Wilhelm supported Adolf Hitler's rise to power, but when Wilhelm realised that Hitler had no intention of restoring the monarchy, their association cooled. Wilhelm became head of the House of Hohenzollern on 4 June 1941 following the death of his father and held the position until his own death on 20 July 1951.

== Early life ==
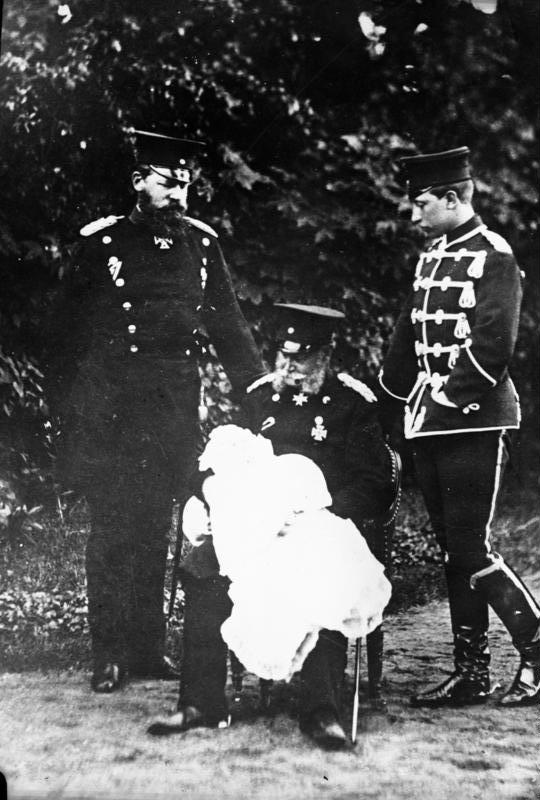
Four generations in the House of Hohenzollern: Emperor Wilhelm I, Crown Prince Frederick, Prince Wilhelm and the newborn Prince Wilhelm in Potsdam in 1882.

Wilhelm was born on 6 May 1882 as the eldest son of the then Prince Wilhelm of Prussia, and his first wife, Princess Augusta Victoria of Schleswig-Holstein. He was born in the Marmorpalais of Potsdam in the Province of Brandenburg, where his parents resided until his father acceded to the throne. When he was born, his great-grandfather Wilhelm I was the German Emperor and his grandfather Crown Prince Frederick was the heir apparent, making Wilhelm third in line to the throne.

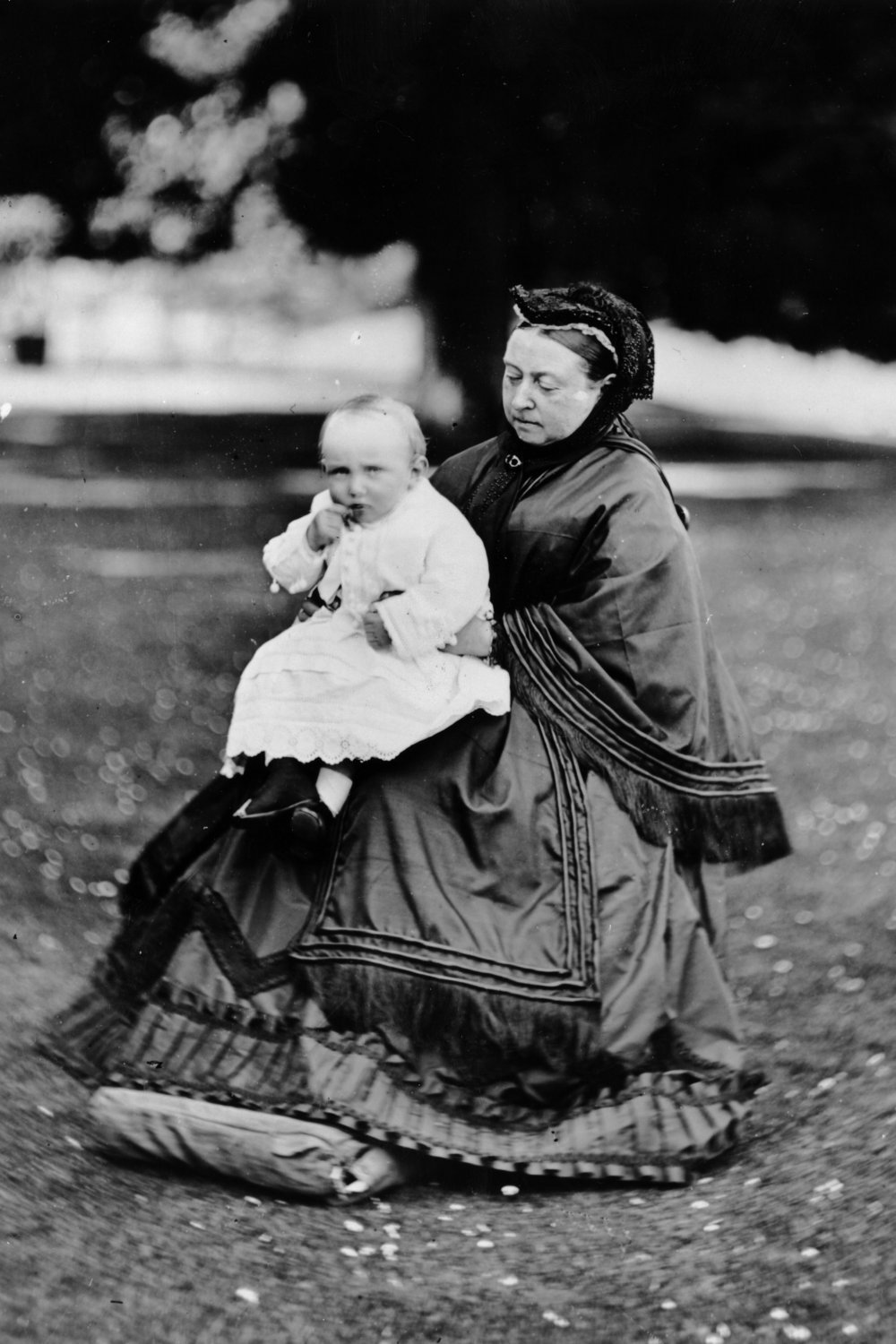
Queen Victoria with her great-grandson Prince Wilhelm in 1883

His birth sparked an argument between his parents and his grandmother Crown Princess Victoria. Before Wilhelm was born, his grandmother had expected to be asked to help find a nurse, but since her son did everything he could to snub her, the future Wilhelm II asked his aunt Princess Helena to help instead. His mother was hurt and his grandmother, Queen Victoria, who was the younger Wilhelm's great-grandmother, was furious.

Prince Wilhelm would have five younger brothers – Prince Eitel Friedrich, Prince Adalbert, Prince August Wilhelm, Prince Oskar and Prince Joachim – and one younger sister: Princess Viktoria Luise. He spent his childhood with his siblings at Marmorpalais and after his father's accession to the throne at the New Palace, also in Potsdam.

In 1888, the Year of the Three Emperors when his great-grandfather and grandfather both died, his father became German Emperor, and six-year-old Wilhelm became the heir apparent to the German and Prussian thrones with the title of crown prince. He spent his school days with his brothers at the Prinzenhaus in Plön in his mother's ancestral Schleswig-Holstein.

Wilhelm was a supporter of association football, then a relatively new sport in the country, donating a cup to the German Football Association in 1908 and thereby initiating the Kronprinzenpokal (now Länderpokal), the oldest cup competition in German football. The German club BFC Preussen was also originally named BFC Friedrich Wilhelm in his honour.

In 1914, the Kaiser ordered the construction of Schloss Cecilienhof in Potsdam for Prince Wilhelm and his family which angered him. The Schloss was loosely inspired by Bidston Court in Birkenhead, England, resembling a Tudor manor. Completed in 1917, it became the main residence for the Crown Prince for a time.

== World War I ==
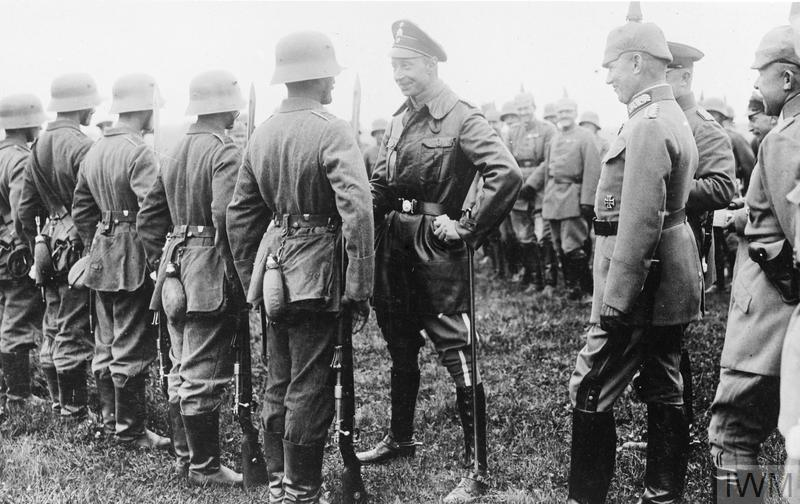
Wilhelm inspecting German troops in 1917

Wilhelm had been active in pushing German expansion, and sought a leading role on the outbreak of war. Despite being only thirty-two and having never commanded a unit larger than a regiment, the German crown prince was named commander of the 5th Army in August 1914, shortly after the outbreak of World War I. However, under the well-established Prussian/German General Staff model then in use, inexperienced nobles who were afforded commands of large army formations were always provided with (and expected to defer to the advice of) experienced chiefs of staff to assist them in their duties. As emperor, Wilhelm's father instructed the crown prince to defer to the advice of his experienced chief of staff Konstantin Schmidt von Knobelsdorf.

In October 1914 Wilhelm gave his first interview to a foreign correspondent and the first statement to the press made by a German noble since the outbreak of war. He denied promoting military solutions to diplomatic problems, and said this in English:

Undoubtedly this is the most stupid, senseless and unnecessary war of modern times. It is a war not wanted by Germany, I can assure you, but it was forced on us, and the fact that we were so effectually prepared to defend ourselves is now being used as an argument to convince the world that we desired conflict.

— Crown Prince Wilhelm, Wiegand

From August 1915 onwards, Wilhelm was given the additional role as commander of the Army Group German Crown Prince. In 1916 his troops began the Verdun offensive, a year-long effort to destroy the French armies that would end in failure. He personally ordered a naval gun to fire the first shot on 21 February 1916, starting the deadly battle. However, even these sorts of duties were essentially ceremonial with the actual planning of operations involving units under the Crown Prince's formal command being carried out by staff officers. Wilhelm relinquished command of the 5th Army in November of that year, but remained commander of the Army Group German Crown Prince for the rest of the war.

== 1918–34 ==
After the outbreak of the German Revolution in 1918, both Emperor Wilhelm II and the crown prince signed the document of abdication. On 13 November, the former crown prince fled Germany, crossed into the Netherlands at Oudvroenhoven and was later interned on the island of Wieringen (now part of the mainland), near Den Helder. In the autumn of 1921, Gustav Stresemann visited Wilhelm, and the former crown prince voiced an interest in returning to Germany, even as a private citizen. After Stresemann became chancellor in August 1923, Wilhelm was allowed to return after giving assurances that he would not engage in politics. He chose 9 November 1923 for this, which infuriated his father, who had not been informed about the plans of his son and who felt the historic date to be inappropriate.

In June 1926, a referendum on expropriating the former ruling Princes of Germany without compensation failed and as a consequence, the financial situation of the Hohenzollern family improved considerably. A settlement between the state and the family made Cecilienhof property of the state but granted a right of residence to Wilhelm and his wife Cecilie. This was limited in duration to three generations.

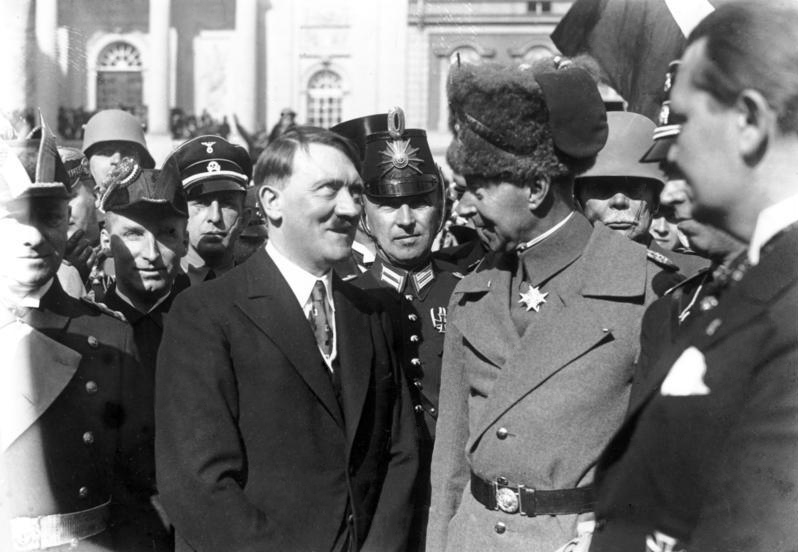
Meeting Adolf Hitler in 1933

Wilhelm broke the promise he had made to Stresemann to stay out of politics. Adolf Hitler visited Wilhelm at Cecilienhof three times, in 1926, in 1933 (on the "Day of Potsdam") and in 1935. Wilhelm joined Der Stahlhelm, which merged in 1931 into the Harzburg Front, a right-wing organisation of those opposed to the democratic republic.

The former crown prince was reportedly interested in the idea of running for President as the right-wing candidate against Paul von Hindenburg in 1932, until his father (who privately supported Hindenburg) forbade him from acting on the idea. After this, Wilhelm supported Hitler's rise to power.

== 1934–51 ==
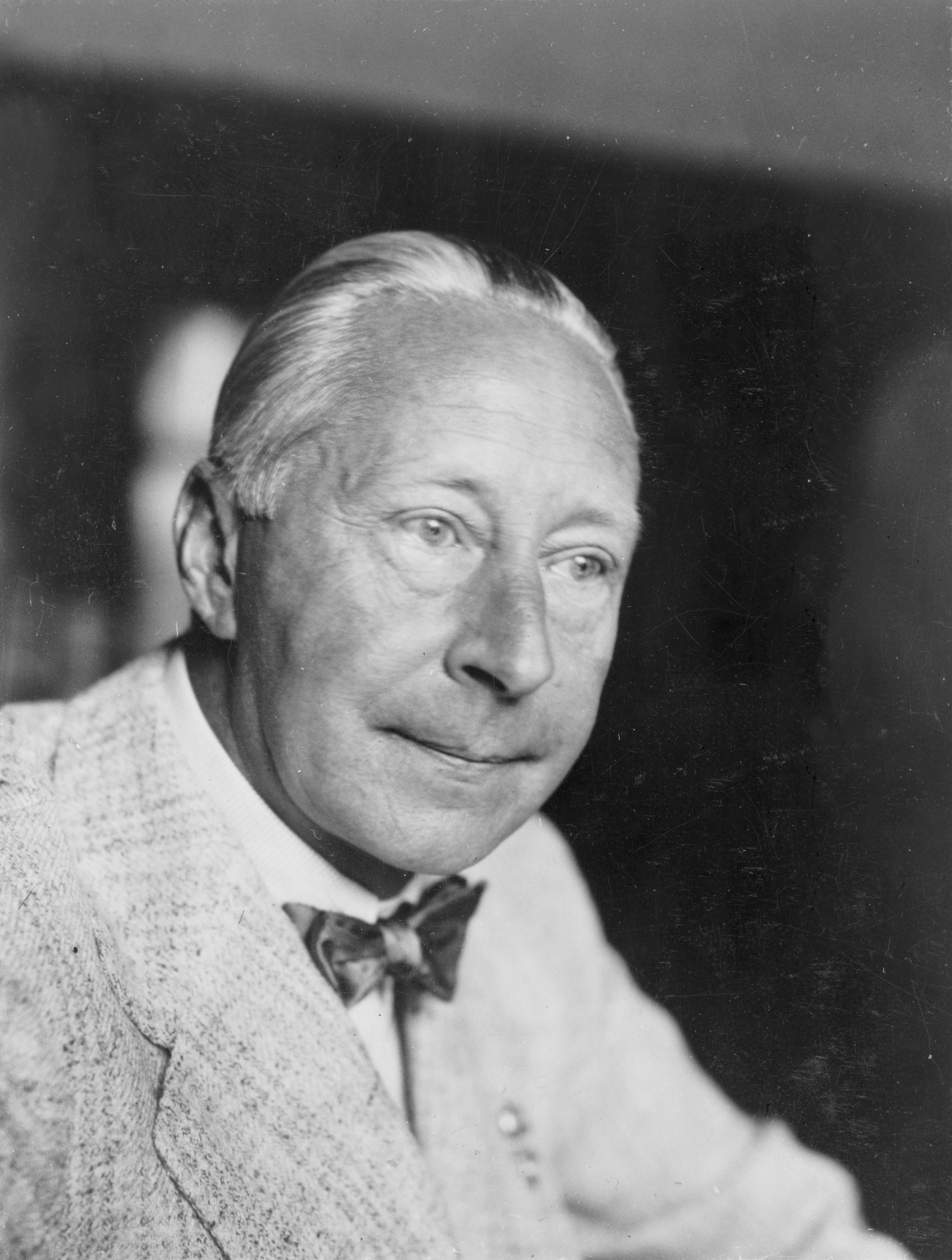
Photograph of Wilhelm, c. 1933

After the murder of his friend Kurt von Schleicher, the former Chancellor, in the Night of the Long Knives, Wilhelm withdrew from all political activities.

When Wilhelm realised that Hitler had no intention of restoring the monarchy, their association cooled. Upon his father's death in 1941, Wilhelm succeeded him as head of the House of Hohenzollern, the former German imperial dynasty. He was approached by those in the military and the diplomatic service who wanted to replace Hitler, but Wilhelm turned them down. After the ill-fated assassination attempt on 20 July 1944, Hitler nevertheless had Wilhelm placed under supervision by the Gestapo and had his home at Cecilienhof watched.

In January 1945, Wilhelm left Potsdam for Oberstdorf for a treatment of his gall and liver problems. His wife Cecilie fled in early February 1945 as the Red Army drew closer to Berlin, but they had been living apart for a long time. At the end of World War II in Europe, Wilhelm's home, Cecilienhof, was seized by the Soviets. The palace was subsequently used by the Allied Powers as the venue for the Potsdam Conference.

At the end of the war, Wilhelm was captured by French Moroccan troops in Baad, Austria, and was interned as a (World War I) war criminal. Transferred to Hechingen, Germany, he lived for a short time in Hohenzollern Castle under house arrest before moving to a small five-room house at Fürstenstraße 16 in Hechingen. He died there on 20 July 1951, of a heart attack. It was exactly seven years after the 20 July plot. Three days later, his opponent in the Battle of Verdun, Marshal Philippe Pétain, died in prison in France.

Wilhelm and his wife are buried at Hohenzollern Castle.

== Family and children ==
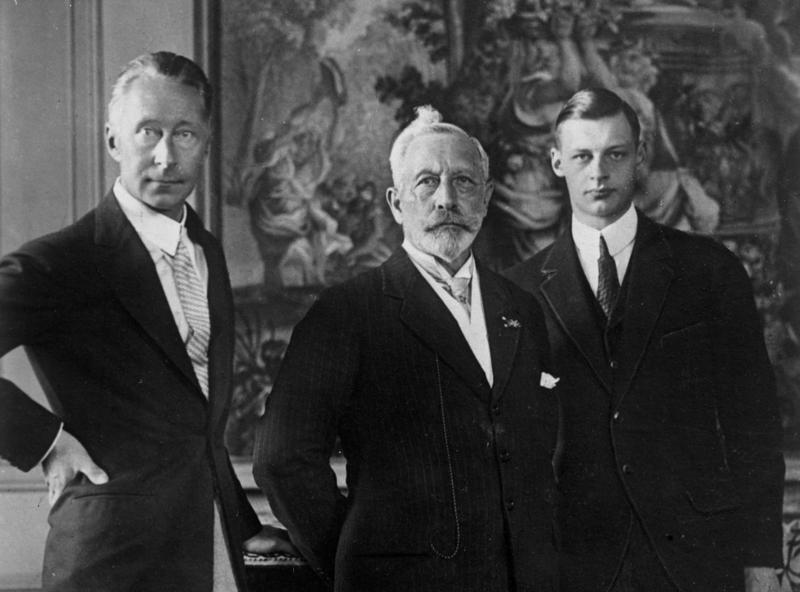
With his father and his son, Prince Wilhelm, in 1927

Wilhelm married his third cousin, Duchess Cecilie of Mecklenburg-Schwerin (20 September 1886 – 6 May 1954) in Berlin on 6 June 1905. After their marriage, the couple lived at the Crown Prince's Palace in Berlin during the winter and at the Marmorpalais in Potsdam, later at Cecilienhof in Potsdam. Cecilie was the daughter of Frederick Francis III, Grand Duke of Mecklenburg-Schwerin (1851–1897) and his wife, Grand Duchess Anastasia Mikhailovna of Russia (1860–1922). Their eldest son, Prince Wilhelm of Prussia, was killed fighting for the German Army in France in 1940. Although the marriage appeared to be perfect and happy to the public, it was deeply strained due to Wilhelm's lifestyle. Throughout his life, he maintained a reputation as a prominent playboy and womanizer, engaging in numerous love affairs with other women. In addition to his high-profile affairs with actresses, singers or high society women, he frequently pursued casual affairs with local women, including during his post-war exile in Wieringen, where he reportedly fathered several illegitimate children. These continuous relationships caused several cracks in the marriage early on, leaving his wife deeply unhappy.

Their children were:

- Prince Wilhelm of Prussia (1906–1940), who renounced his succession rights in 1933 in order to marry Dorothea von Salviati, and had issue
- Louis Ferdinand, Prince of Prussia (1907–1994); married 1938 Grand Duchess Kira Kirillovna of Russia and had issue
- Prince Hubertus of Prussia (1909–1950); married first to Baroness Maria von Humboldt-Dachroeden, 1941–1943; then in 1943 Princess Magdalena Reuss of Köstritz and had issue
- Prince Frederick of Prussia (1911–1966); married 1945 Lady Brigid Guinness and had issue:
- Princess Alexandrine of Prussia, called "Adini" (1915–1980)
- Princess Cecilie of Prussia (1917–1975); married Clyde Kenneth Harris on 21 June 1949, and had issue

== In literature and popular culture ==
Wilhelm's reputation as a military commander was satirised by Neil Munro in his Erchie MacPherson story, "Bad News", first published in the Glasgow Evening News on 8 January 1917.

== Honours ==
German honours

- Kingdom of Prussia:
  - Knight of the Black Eagle, 6 May 1892; with Collar
  - Knight of the Royal Crown Order, 1st Class, 6 May 1892
  - Grand Commander's Cross of the Royal House Order of Hohenzollern, 6 May 1892
  - Grand Cross of the Red Eagle, with Crown, 12 June 1892
  - Iron Cross (1914), 2nd and 1st Classes
  - Pour le Mérite (military), 22 August 1915; with Oak Leaves, 8 September 1916
- Hohenzollern: Cross of Honour of the Princely House Order of Hohenzollern, 1st Class with Swords
- Anhalt:
  - Grand Cross of the Order of Albert the Bear, with Swords
  - Friedrich Cross, 1st Class
- Baden:
  - Knight of the House Order of Fidelity, 1900
  - Grand Cross of the Order of Berthold the First, 1900
- Kingdom of Bavaria:
  - Knight of St. Hubert, 1900
  - Grand Cross of the Military Order of Max Joseph
- Duchy of Brunswick:
  - Grand Cross of the Order of Henry the Lion, 1902; with Swords
  - War Merit Cross
- Ernestine duchies:
  - Grand Cross of the Saxe-Ernestine House Order, with Swords
  - Cross for Merit in War (Saxe-Meiningen)
- Free Hanseatic Cities: Hanseatic Crosses
- Hesse and by Rhine:
  - Grand Cross of the Ludwig Order, 6 May 1900
  - General Honor Decoration
- Lippe:
  - War Honor Cross for Heroic Deeds
  - War Merit Cross
- Mecklenburg:
  - Grand Cross of the Wendish Crown, with Crown in Ore
  - Military Merit Cross, 1st Class (Schwerin)
- Oldenburg: Grand Cross of the Order of Duke Peter Friedrich Ludwig, with Golden Crown
- Reuss: War Merit Cross
- Saxe-Weimar-Eisenach: Grand Cross of the White Falcon, 1896; with Swords
- Kingdom of Saxony:
  - Knight of the Rue Crown, 1900
  - Commander of the Military Order of St. Henry, 1st Class
- Württemberg:
  - Grand Cross of the Württemberg Crown, 1899
  - Grand Cross of the Military Merit Order

Foreign honours

- Austria-Hungary: Grand Cross of the Royal Hungarian Order of St. Stephen, 1898
- Belgium: Grand Cordon of the Order of Leopold
- Kingdom of Bulgaria: Grand Cross of St. Alexander
- Qing dynasty: Order of the Double Dragon, Class I Grade II
- Denmark: Knight of the Elephant, 6 May 1900
- Greece: Grand Cross of the Redeemer
- Kingdom of Italy: Knight of the Annunciation, 13 April 1896
- Empire of Japan: Grand Cordon of the Order of the Chrysanthemum, 19 September 1899
- Monaco: Grand Cross of St. Charles, 15 January 1900
- Netherlands: Grand Cross of the Netherlands Lion
- Norway: Grand Cross of St. Olav, with Collar, 15 December 1906
- Ottoman Empire:
  - Order of Distinction
  - Order of Osmanieh, 1st Class in Diamonds
  - Order of Glory
- Persia: Order of the Aqdas, 1st Class
- Kingdom of Portugal:
  - Grand Cross of the Sash of the Two Orders
  - Grand Cross of the Tower and Sword, with Collar
- Kingdom of Romania:
  - Collar of the Order of Carol I
  - Grand Cross of the Crown of Romania
- Kingdom of Serbia: Grand Cross of the White Eagle
- Siam: Knight of the Order of the Royal House of Chakri
- Spain: Knight of the Golden Fleece, January 1900 (Note: Invested in Berlin on 2 March 1900 by the Duke of Veragua on behalf of King Alfonso XIII of Spain; the insignia was the same as those which were worn by the Emperor Wilhelm I))
- Sweden: Knight of the Seraphim, 27 July 1888
- United Kingdom of Great Britain and Ireland:
  - Stranger Knight Companion of the Garter, 27 January 1901 (expelled in 1915)
  - Recipient of the Royal Victorian Chain, June 1904 (expelled in 1915)
- Russian Empire:
  - Knight of St. Andrew
  - Knight of St. Alexander Nevsky
  - Knight of the White Eagle
  - Knight of St. Anna, 1st Class
  - Knight of St. Stanislaus, 1st Class

Foreign military appointments

- During a visit to Russia in January 1903 he was appointed Honorary Colonel of the Little Russian Dragoon Regiment No. 40.

== Coat of arms ==
Coat of arms of Wilhelm as crown prince

== Notes ==
Wilhelm, German Crown Prince House of Hohenzollern Born: 6 May 1882 Died: 20 July 1951
Titles in pretence
Preceded by Wilhelm II as Former German Emperor and King of Prussia	— TITULAR — Head of the German and Prussian royal families 4 June 1941 – 20 July 1951; Reason for succession failure: German Revolution	Succeeded by Louis Ferdinand
Military offices
Preceded by Formed from VII Army Inspectorate (VII. Armee-Inspektion)	Commander, 5th Army; 2 August 1914 – 30 November 1916	Succeeded by General der Infanterie Ewald von Lochow
Preceded by New Creation	Commander, Army Group German Crown Prince; 1 August 1915 – 10 November 1918	Succeeded by Karl von Einem
