= Clyde Kenneth Harris =

American soldier and interior decorator

- Born: April 18, 1918; Maud, Oklahoma, U.S.
- Died: March 2, 1958 (aged 39); Amarillo, Texas, U.S.
- Education: University of Oklahoma; Parsons School of Design
- Spouse: Princess Cecilie of Prussia (m. 1949)
- Children: Kira Harris
- Parent(s): Bert Van Buren Harris; Aurora Vandevere Harris

Clyde Kenneth Harris (April 18, 1918 – March 2, 1958) was an American soldier and interior decorator. He served as one of the "Monuments Men" during World War II and later married a granddaughter of Kaiser Wilhelm II.

== Early life ==
Harris was born on April 18, 1918, in Maud, Oklahoma. He was the son of banker Bert Van Buren Harris (1886–1974), vice president of the First National Bank in Oklahoma, and Aurora (née Vandevere) Harris (1891–1969) and grew up in Konawa, Oklahoma.

Harris graduated with a degree in interior decoration from the University of Oklahoma in 1939, where he was president of the Sigma Alpha Epsilon fraternity, a member of Phi Eta Sigma, and secretary of Delta Phi Delta. After earning his BFA, he was offered a scholarship to study in Paris, but instead attended the Parsons School of Design in New York.

== Career ==
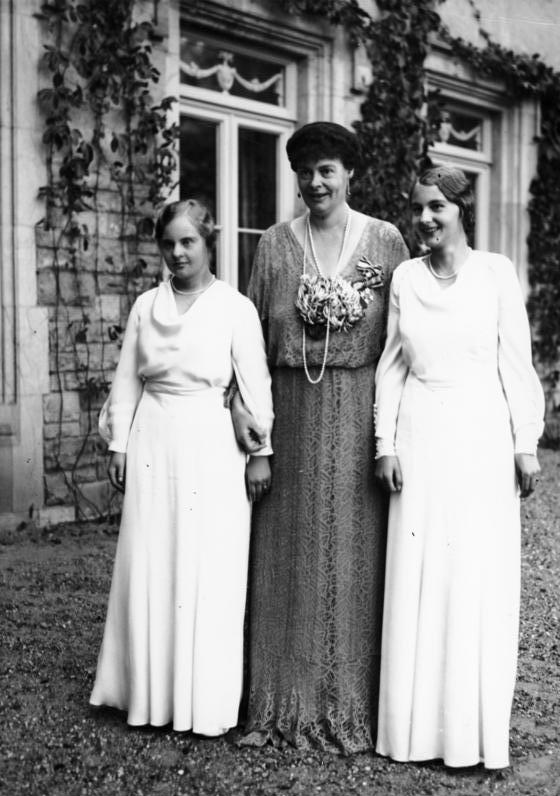
Harris' wife, Princess Cecilie (right), along with her mother and sister, pictured in 1934.

In 1943, he enlisted in the United States Army Corps of Engineers as Captain, but was later assigned to the Monuments, Fine Arts, and Archives program in August 1945. While working with the MFAA, he retrieved Holbein's Madonna from the dungeon of Coburg Castle. He was later sent to Wolfsgarten Castle to conduct interviews relating to the theft of the Hessen crown jewels (by, as it turned out, three Americans).

During the course of his investigation, he met Princess Cecilie Viktoria Anastasia Zita Thyra Adelheid of Prussia, daughter of Crown Prince Wilhelm of Germany and granddaughter of Kaiser Wilhelm II. The two were married at Hohenzollern Castle on June 21, 1949. The pair settled in Amarillo, Texas, where Harris established an interior decorating business. Together, they were the parents of one daughter, Kira, in 1954.

Harris died of a cerebral hemorrhage at the age of 39 on March 2, 1958. His widow died in 1975 while visiting family in West Germany.
