= Princess Cecilie of Prussia =

German princess (1917–1975)

Princess Cecilie
- Mrs. Clyde Harris
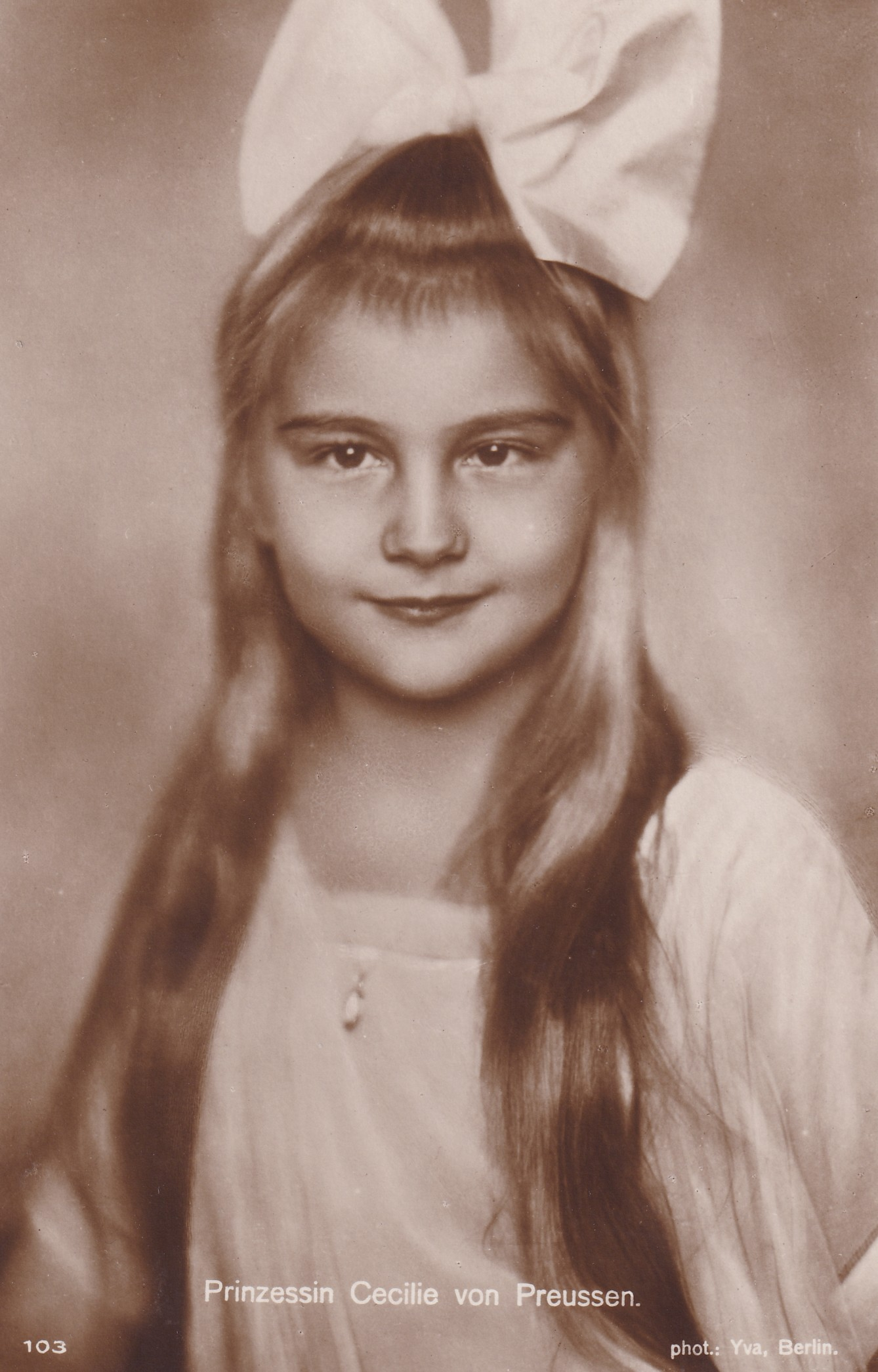
- Cecilie in 1926
- Born: 5 September 1917; Cecilienhof Palace, Potsdam, German Empire
- Died: 21 April 1975 (aged 57); Königstein im Taunus, Hesse, West Germany
- Spouse: Clyde Harris (m. 1949; died 1958)
- Issue: Kira Harris
Names
- Cecilie Viktoria Anastasia Zita Thyra Adelheid
- House: Hohenzollern
- Father: Wilhelm, German Crown Prince
- Mother: Duchess Cecilie of Mecklenburg-Schwerin

Princess Cecilie of Prussia (Cecilie Viktoria Anastasia Zita Thyra Adelheid; 5 September 1917 – 21 April 1975) was a member of the House of Hohenzollern. She was the younger daughter and sixth child of Wilhelm, German Crown Prince, and Duchess Cecilie of Mecklenburg-Schwerin.

== Early life ==
Cecilie was born on 5 September 1917 at Cecilienhof Palace in Potsdam, which had only been completed weeks prior to her birth, during World War I and the reign of paternal grandfather, Wilhelm II, as German Emperor and King of Prussia. One year after her birth, on 9 November 1918, her grandfather and other German monarchs abdicated and the German Empire was abolished.

After the war, Cecilienhof was confiscated by the state and the family moved to Oels in Lower Silesia, which was their private property. Cecilienhof was returned to Cecilie's family in 1926. In 1934, she was confirmed alongside her elder sister, Alexandrine, who had Down syndrome. She was educated at a women's seminary in Heiligengrabe and later worked at the Prussian Privy State Archives. During World War II, Cecilie worked at a pharmacy in Potsdam and trained as a nurse with the German Red Cross.

As the Red Army descended on Potsdam at the end of the war, Cecilie was sent to live with Hessian relatives at Schloss Wolfsgarten. There, she met American Captain Clyde Kenneth Harris, a member of the Monuments, Fine Arts, and Archives Unit who was investigating the Darmstadt Madonna for her cousin, Ludwig, Prince of Hesse and by Rhine. When Harris returned to the United States to be demobilized, their courtship continued by airmail. Before marrying, she received several other marriage proposals. Prince Vsevolod of Russia proposed to her twice, but she declined both times.

== Marriage and family ==
Cecilie and Harris were married on 21 June 1949 at Hohenzollern Castle. The couple settled in Amarillo, Texas, where Harris worked as an interior designer. They had one daughter, Kira Alexandrine Brigid Cecilie Ingrid Harris (born 20 October 1954) who married John Mitchell Johnson (12 May 1951 Dallas, Texas-) and had one son, Philip Louis Johnson (18 Oct 1985 Fort Worth, Texas-). Clyde Harris died of a cerebral hemorrhage in 1958, aged 39.

While visiting family in Germany, Cecilie died in Königstein im Taunus on 21 April 1975, aged 57. She is buried at Hohenzollern Castle.

== Ancestry ==
Ancestors of Princess Cecilie of Prussia

8. Frederick III, German Emperor
4. Wilhelm II, German Emperor
9. Victoria, Princess Royal
2. Wilhelm, German Crown Prince
10. Frederick VIII of Schleswig-Holstein
5. Princess Augusta Victoria of Schleswig-Holstein-Sonderburg-Augustenburg
11. Princess Adelheid of Hohenlohe-Langenburg
1. Princess Cecilie of Prussia
12. Frederick Francis II, Grand Duke of Mecklenburg-Schwerin
6. Frederick Francis III, Grand Duke of Mecklenburg-Schwerin
13. Princess Augusta Reuss of Köstritz
3. Duchess Cecilie of Mecklenburg-Schwerin
14. Grand Duke Michael Nikolaevich of Russia
7. Grand Duchess Anastasia Mikhailovna of Russia
15. Princess Cecilie of Baden
