= Sofiero Palace =

Swedish royal palace in Scania

- Sofiero slott
- Helsingborg Municipality
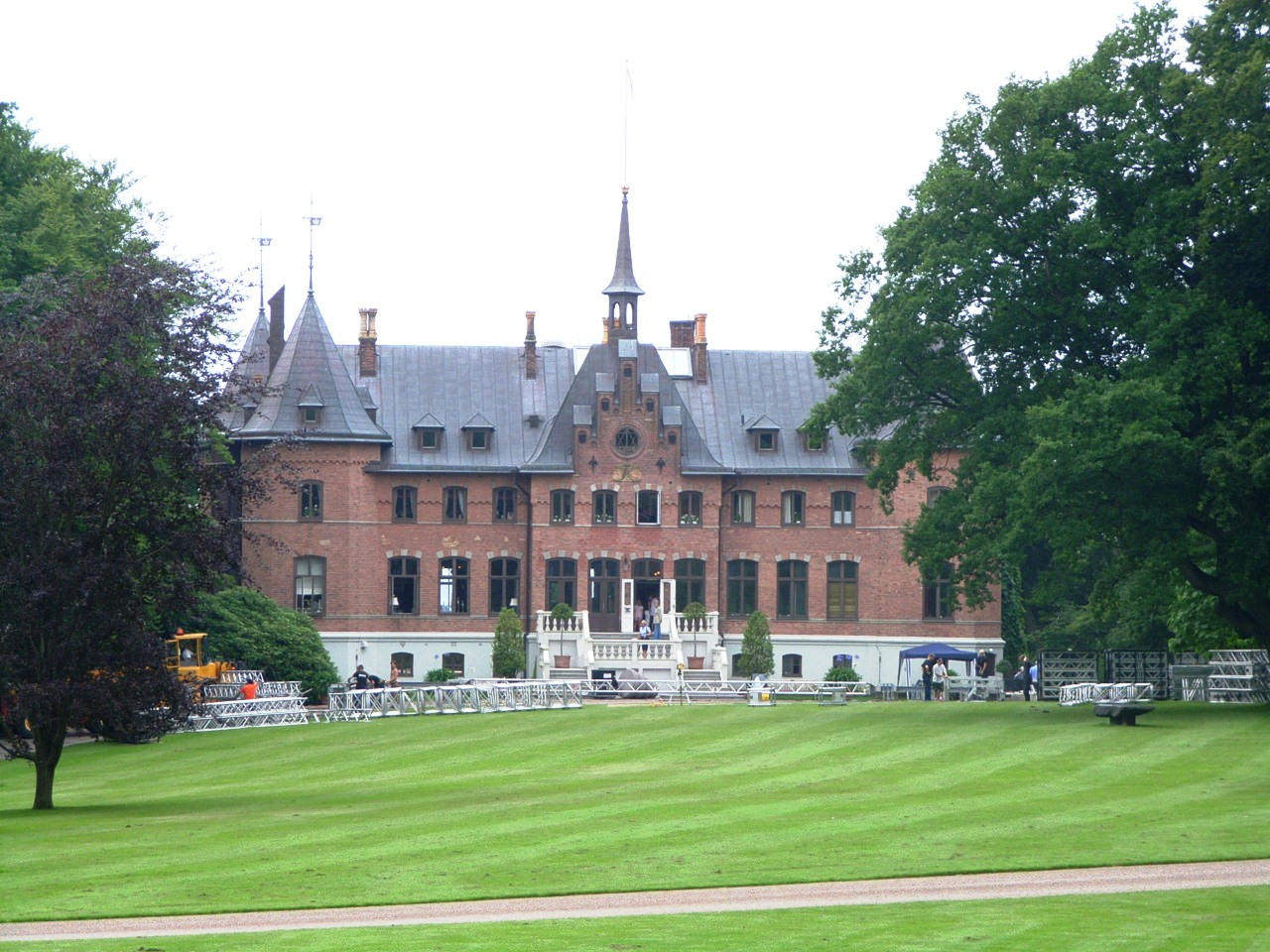
- Sofiero Palace

Site information
- Type: Former royal palace
- Open to the public: Yes

Location
- Scania, Sweden
- Location within Skåne
- Coordinates: 56.0839°N 12.6597°E

Site history
- Built: 1865; 161 years ago

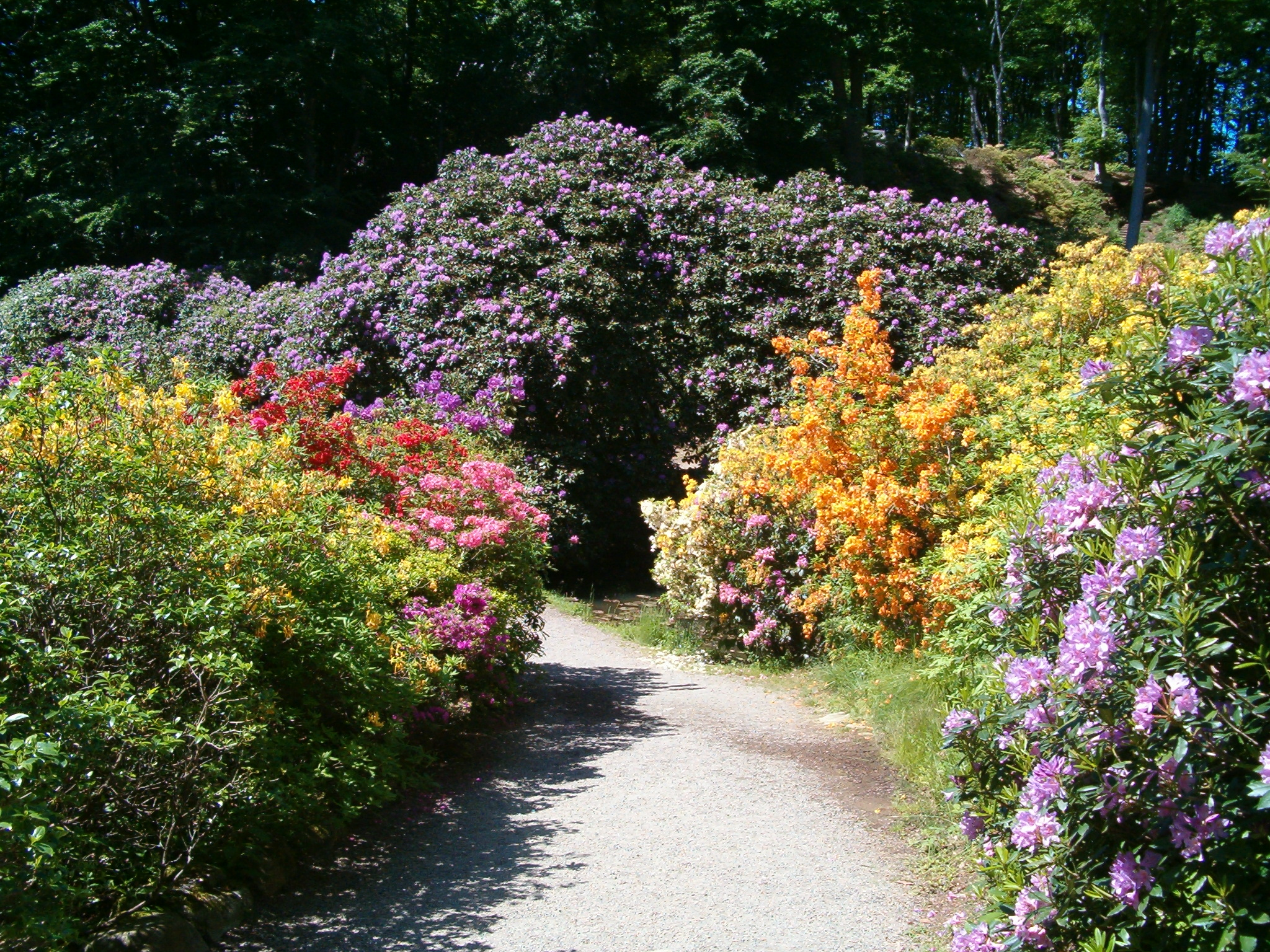
Gardens of Sofiero Palace

Sofiero Palace, or just Sofiero (Swedish: "Sofiero slott", or just "Sofiero"), in Helsingborg Municipality, Scania, was one of the Swedish royal family's country mansions, located 5 kilometres (3.1 mi) north of Helsingborg. It was originally a Scanian farm called Skabelycke, bought in 1864 by Prince Oscar of Sweden and his wife Sophia of Nassau. The first one-story palace was completed in 1865. It was expanded to its current size between 1874 and 1876, after Prince Oscar had been crowned King Oscar II of Sweden and Norway.

== History ==
In 1905, Oscar II's grandson Prince Gustaf Adolf, future King Gustaf VI Adolf, and his wife, Crown Princess Margaret, received the palace as a wedding gift. They renovated the palace and started the large rhododendron garden for which the palace is known today. Prince Gustaf Adolf become king in 1950, and until 1973 Sofiero was his and his second wife Lady Louise Mountbatten's official summer residence. It was supposedly the King's favorite place and upon his death, which occurred in Helsingborg, he left Sofiero to the city of Helsingborg so that the general public could enjoy it as much as he had.

== Today ==
A bus connection leaves several times an hour during peak hours from Helsingborg. The main attraction today is the garden (17 ha, 42 acres) with a wide range of local (and other) plant life, stretching to the shore of Öresund. The Rhododendrons are especially noteworthy, consisting of almost 500 different varieties. The park also holds a small collection of modern art.

During the summer the large grass areas are sometimes used for large outdoor concerts with national as well as international stars such as Bob Dylan, Bryan Adams, James Brown and Norah Jones.

In the former royal palace itself there is an exhibition about the history of the palace, a restaurant and a cafe.

In the park there are some modern works of art.

A brand of beer owned by Kopparbergs Brewery is named "Sofiero".

== See also ==
- Helsingborg
