= Princess Alexandrine of Prussia (1915–1980) =

German princess (1915–1980)

Princess Alexandrine
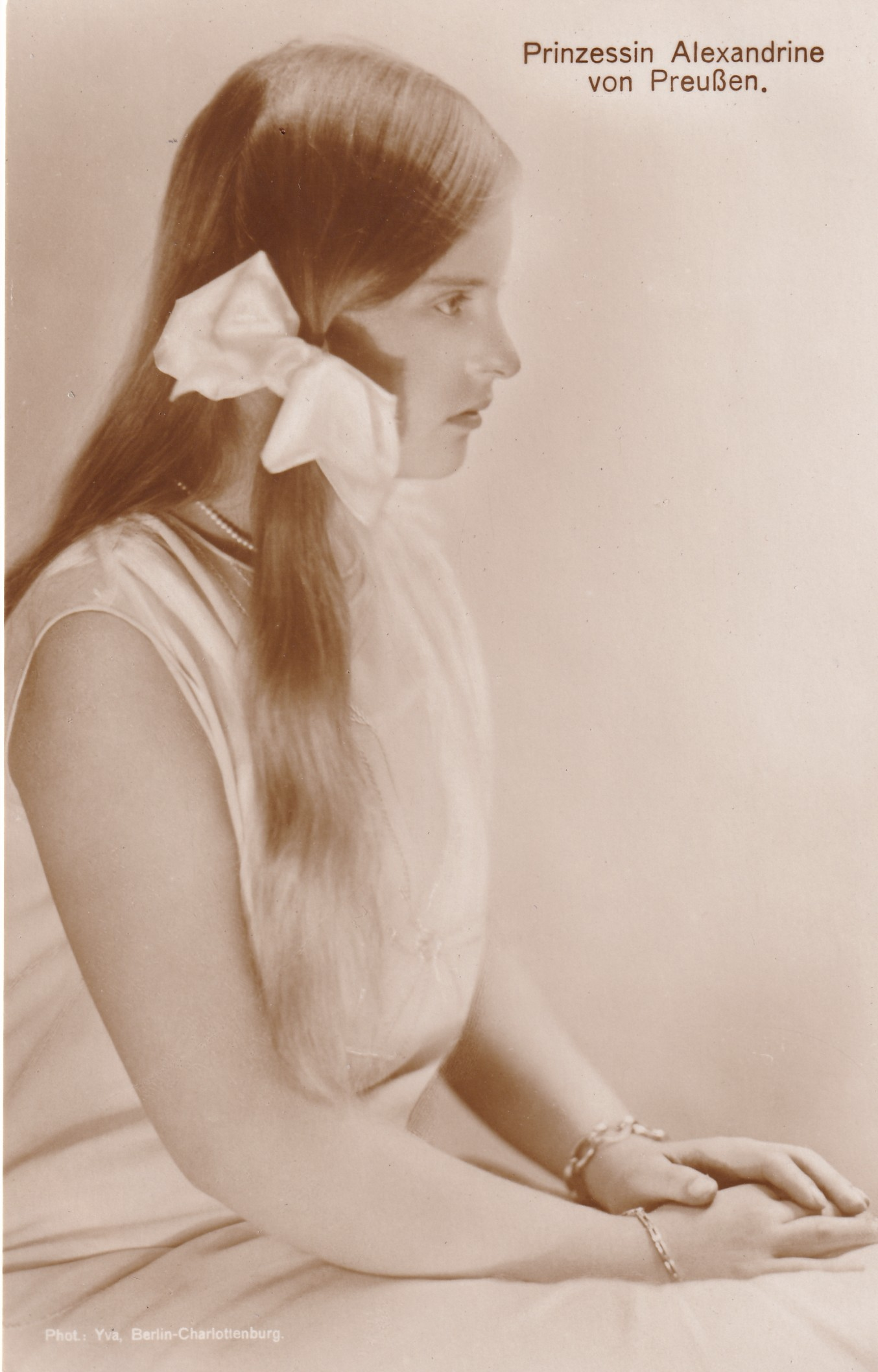
- Princess Alexandrine of Prussia, 1930, by Yva
- Born: 7 April 1915; Kronprinzenpalais, Berlin, Kingdom of Prussia, German Empire
- Died: 2 October 1980 (aged 65); Starnberg, Bavaria, West Germany
- Burial: Hohenzollern Castle Crypt, Hohenzollern Castle, Baden-Württemberg, West Germany
Names
- Alexandrine Irene
- House: Hohenzollern
- Father: Crown Prince Wilhelm of Germany
- Mother: Duchess Cecilie of Mecklenburg-Schwerin

Princess Alexandrine Irene of Prussia (7 April 1915 – 2 October 1980) was the elder daughter and fifth child of Wilhelm, German Crown Prince, and Cecilie of Mecklenburg-Schwerin. Her grandparents were Wilhelm II, German Emperor and his wife Augusta Victoria of Schleswig-Holstein, and Frederick Francis III of Mecklenburg-Schwerin and Grand Duchess Anastasia Mikhailovna of Russia. Alexandrine was a member of the House of Hohenzollern. She was a great-great-granddaughter of Queen Victoria.

== Life ==
Alexandrine was born at the Kronprinzenpalais in Berlin. Her middle name of Irene (Greek for "peace") was likely given due to her birth during the second year of World War I. She was also called "Adini". She followed older brothers Wilhelm, Louis Ferdinand, Hubertus, and Frederick. Alexandrine's only sister, Cecilie, was born in 1917.

It became clear shortly after Alexandrine's birth that she had Down syndrome. Unlike other disabled royal children, Alexandrine was not hidden away. She appeared in official family photographs and at events. She was cared for primarily by her nurse, Selma Boese. As a teenager, Alexandrine attended the Trüpersche Sonderschule, a school dedicated to the education of children with special needs.

Alexandrine celebrated her confirmation along with her sister Cecilie in October 1934. She spent two years in Potsdam with her mother (1934-1935). In 1936, after the death of her longtime nanny Selma Boese, she moved to the Bavarian town of Niederpöcking, where she stayed during World War II.

Alexandrine lived most of her later life in Bavaria, first in Pöcking and later near Lake Starnberg, where she was visited there regularly by her family, particularly her brother Louis Ferdinand. She was cared for by a nurse named Ericka Strecker. In 1945 she moved into a small house nearby on Lake Starnberg. Strecker was still with her when her mother visited in 1946.

Alexandrine died on 2 October 1980. She was buried near her parents and brother Frederick at Hohenzollern Castle.

== Gallery ==
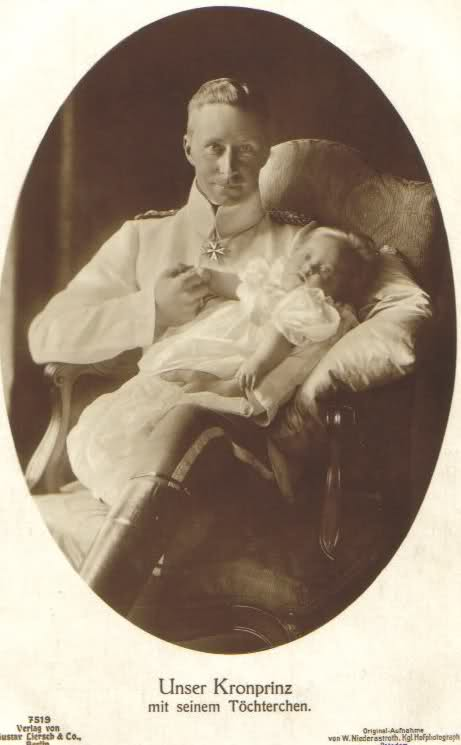
Princess Alexandrine of Prussia with her father, German Crown Prince Wilhelm

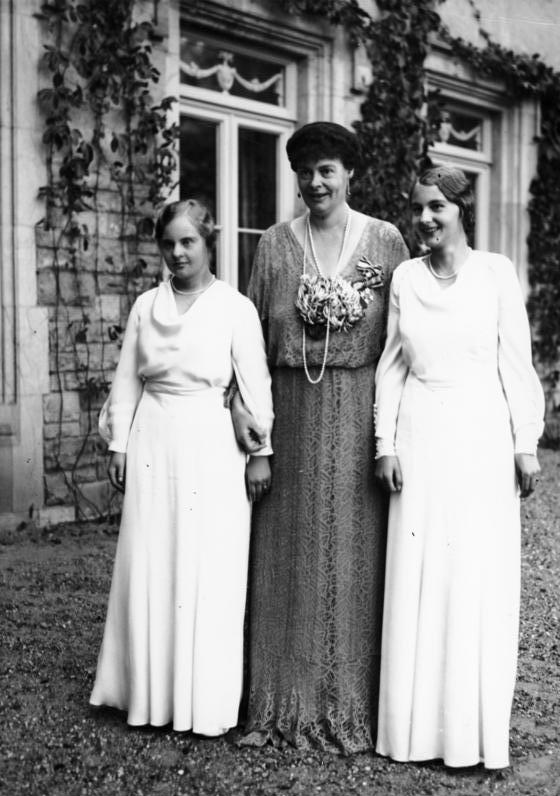
Alexandrine, left, with her Mother and Sister, 1934.

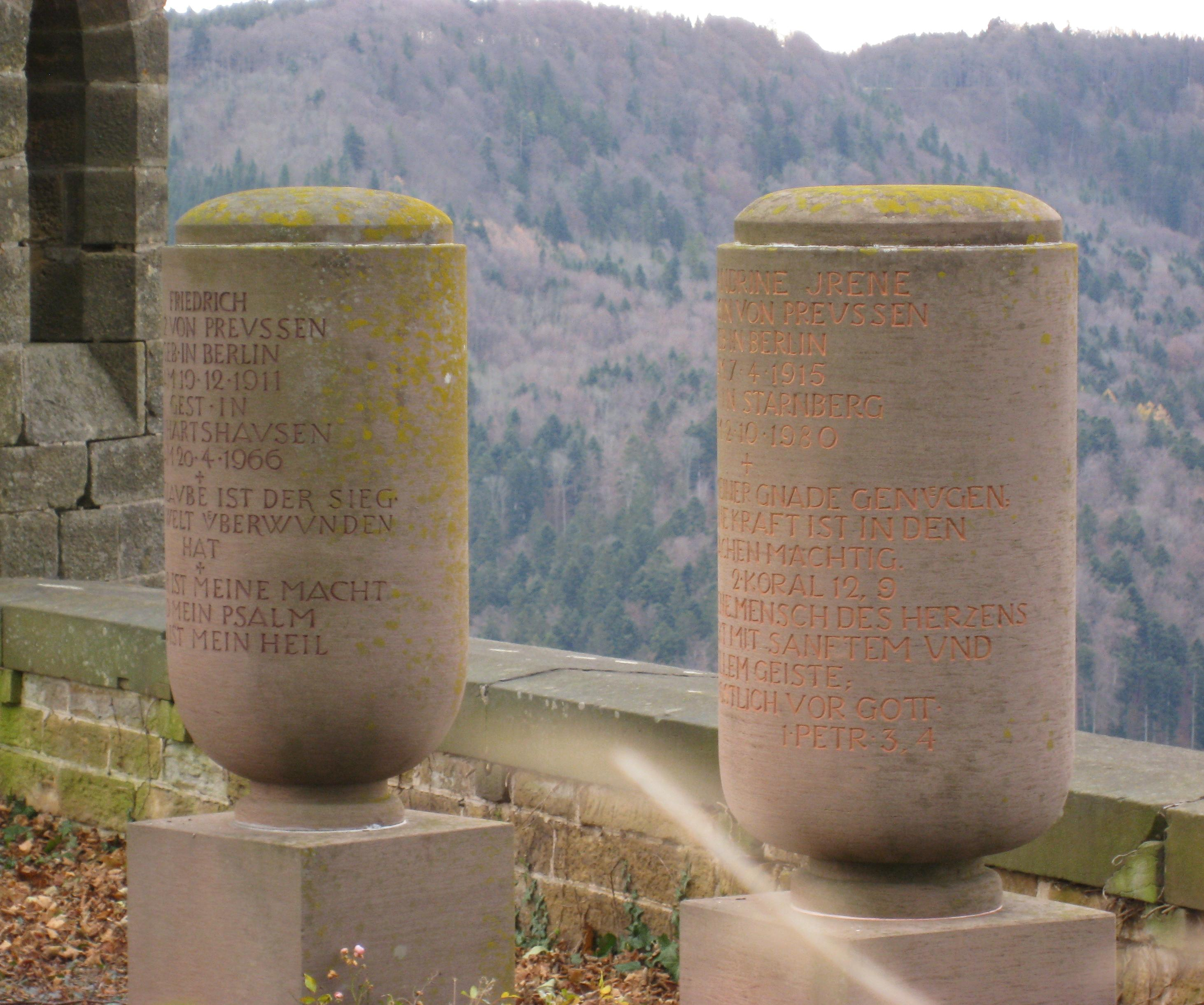
The grave markers of Alexandrine and her brother Frederick.
