= Monarchy of Germany =

System of government from 1871 to 1918

- Federal
- Imperial Coat of arms

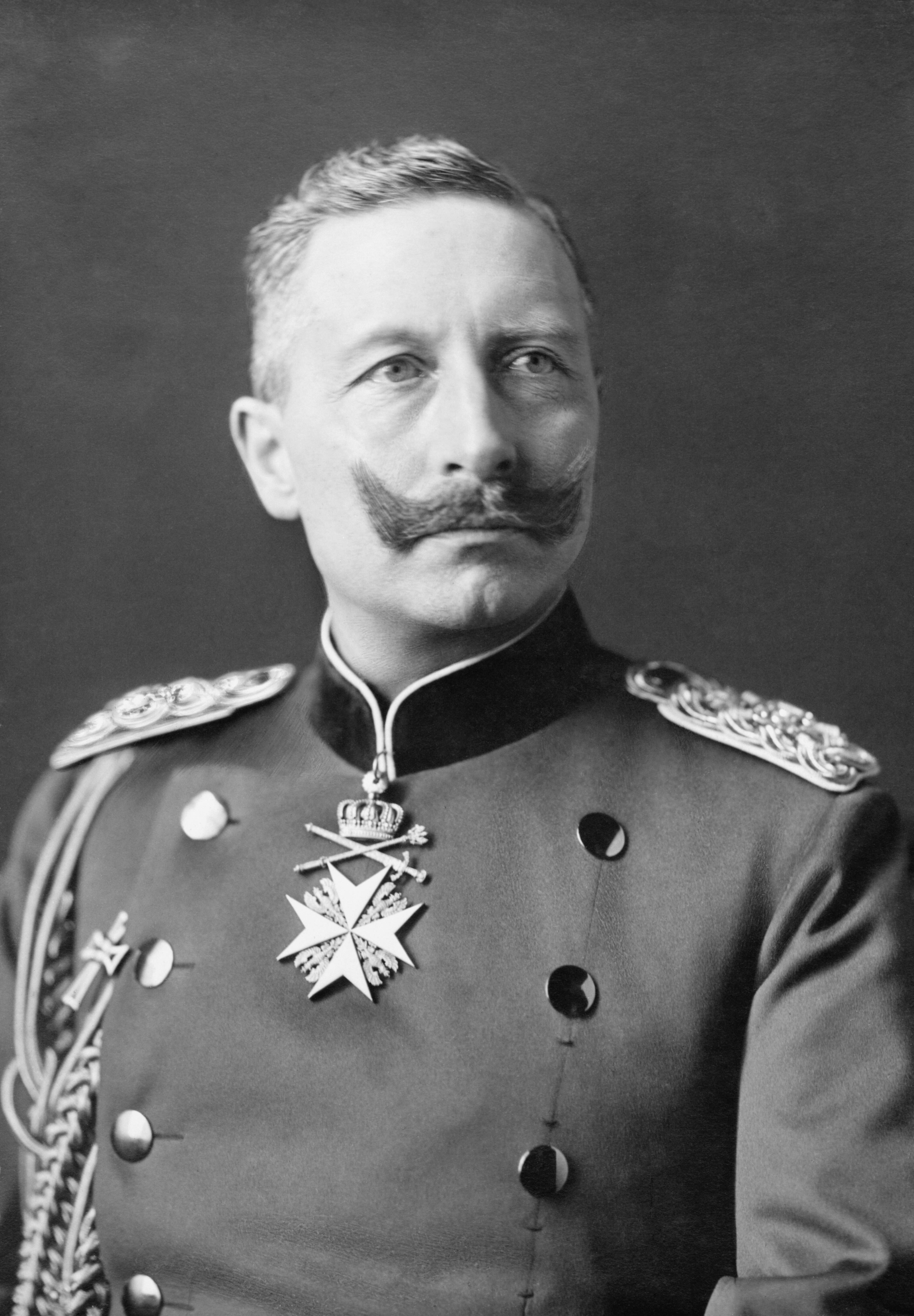
- Wilhelm II

Details
- Style: His Imperial and Royal Majesty
- First monarch: Wilhelm I
- Last monarch: Wilhelm II
- Formed: 18 January 1871
- Abolished: 9 November 1918
- Residences: Stadtschloss, Berlin
- Appointer: Hereditary

The German imperial monarchy was the federal system of government of the German Empire from 1871 to 1918, in which the King of Prussia served ex officio as head of state with the title of German Emperor (Deutscher Kaiser). The imperial monarchy and the constituent monarchies of the federal states ended with the German Revolution of 1918–1919, after which federal Germany was reconstituted as the Weimar Republic.

== History ==
The monarchical office of German Emperor was established on 1 January 1871 with the entry into force of the constitution of the newly unified German Empire, which designated the King of Prussia as the federal president (Bundespräsidium). On 18 January 1871, during the Franco-Prussian War, King Wilhelm I was ceremonially proclaimed German Emperor in the Hall of Mirrors at the Palace of Versailles.

The title German Emperor (German: Deutscher Kaiser) was carefully chosen by Minister President of Prussia and Chancellor of the North German Confederation Otto von Bismarck after discussion until (and after) the day of the proclamation. Wilhelm I accepted this title grudgingly as he would have preferred "Emperor of Germany" which was, however, unacceptable to the federated monarchs, and which would also have signalled a claim to lands outside of his reign (Austria, Switzerland, Luxembourg etc.). The title Emperor of the Germans, as had been proposed at the Frankfurt Parliament in 1848, was ruled out as he considered himself chosen "By the Grace of God", not by the people as in a democracy.

Through the constitutional accession of the southern German states on 1 January 1871, the North German Confederation of 1867 was expanded and transformed into the German Empire. The new state was organized as a federal monarchy; the emperor served as head of state and president of the federal compact, which comprised the allied constituent states—including Prussia, the three additional kingdoms (Bavaria, Saxony, and Württemberg), six grand duchies, five duchies, seven principalities, and the three republican free Hanseatic cities of Hamburg, Lübeck, and Bremen.

== List of German Emperors (1871–1918) ==
Monarch			Consort		Reign		Royal House
#	Portrait	Name	Portrait	Name	Reign start	Reign end	Royal House
1		Emperor William I (1797–1888); Kaiser Wilhelm I		Empress Augusta (1811–1890); Kaiserin Auguste	18 January 1871	9 March 1888	House of Hohenzollern
2		Emperor Frederick III (1831–1888) Kaiser Friedrich III		Empress Victoria (1840–1901) Kaiserin Viktoria	9 March 1888	15 June 1888	House of Hohenzollern
3		Emperor William II (1859–1941); Kaiser Wilhelm II		Empress Augusta Victoria (1858–1921); Kaiserin Auguste Viktoria	15 June 1888	9 November 1918 (Abdicated)	House of Hohenzollern

== Post-1918 House of Hohenzollern ==
The German Revolution of 1918–1919 dissolved both the constituent German monarchies and the federal compact that created the office of German Emperor. Under Article 109 of the 1919 Weimar Constitution, the legal privileges of the nobility were abolished, ending the constitutional basis for individual monarchical titles and eliminating the legal basis for the imperial federal office.

For their part, in late 1918, both Wilhelm II and his heir formally renounced all succession rights. In his formal deed of abdication signed at Amerongen on 28 November 1918, Wilhelm II declared that he renounced "for all time claims to the throne of Prussia and to the German Imperial throne connected therewith." Crown Prince Wilhelm similarly executed a deed of renunciation on 1 December 1918, forfeiting his succession rights to both the Prussian and imperial crowns.

After 1918, the House of Hohenzollern continued to use its traditional dynastic house laws primarily to govern the succession of family trusts and private estate inheritance. In 2004, the Federal Constitutional Court of Germany confirmed that these historical house laws possess no public-law standing and operate strictly within the framework of private civil law, with headship of the family functioning as a private lineage rather than a constitutional office.

Head of House			Consort		Tenure	
#	Portrait	Name	Portrait	Name	From	To
1		Emperor William II (1859–1941)		Empress Augusta Victoria (1858–1921)	9 November 1918	4 June 1941
1		Emperor William II (1859–1941)		Empress Hermine Reuss (1887–1947)	9 November 1918	4 June 1941
2		Crown Prince William (1882–1951)		Crown Princess Cecilie (1886–1954)	4 June 1941	20 July 1951
3		Prince Louis Ferdinand (1907–1994)		Princess Kira Kirillovna (1909–1967)	20 July 1951	26 September 1994
4		Prince George Frederick (1976–)		Princess Sophie (1978–)	26 September 1994	

In 1933, Prince Wilhelm, the eldest son of Crown Prince Wilhelm and second in line of succession, renounced his dynastic rights under house law upon his marriage to the non-royal Dorothea von Salviati. Shortly before Prince Wilhelm was killed in action in May 1940, Wilhelm II recognized his wife and daughters (Felicitas and Christa) as dynastic members, styling them Princesses of Prussia.

Following his elder brother's 1933 renunciation, Prince Louis Ferdinand became the heir to the headship, succeeding his father in 1951. His two eldest sons both forfeited their dynastic succession rights under house law upon contracting unequal marriages: Prince Friedrich Wilhelm renounced his rights in 1967 (marrying Waltraud Freytag), and Prince Michael did so in 1966 (marrying Jutta Jörn). His third son, Prince Louis Ferdinand Jr., died in 1977 following a severe military training accident, leaving an infant son, Georg Friedrich.

When Prince Louis Ferdinand died in 1994, the headship of the family passed to his grandson, Georg Friedrich. However, his succession as sole principal beneficiary of the family trust (*Kronvermögen*) was challenged in court by his uncles, Princes Friedrich Wilhelm and Michael. They argued that their prior renunciations were invalid and that conditioning testamentary inheritance on historical equal-marriage rules violated German constitutional protections regarding marriage equality and freedom of spouse selection.

The dispute led to a decade of civil litigation across multiple jurisdictions. The Regional Court of Hechingen and the Higher Regional Court of Stuttgart initially ruled in favor of the uncles in 1997, finding the equal-marriage clause contrary to public policy (sittenwidrig). After the Federal Court of Justice of Germany remanded the case, the lower courts reversed their position in favor of Georg Friedrich.

His uncles then appealed to the Federal Constitutional Court of Germany, which ruled in 2004 that while historical house laws had lost all public-law status in 1919 and could not restrict testamentary freedom or mandate marriage requirements, family testators were still entitled to structure their wills privately under the civil code.

On 19 October 2005, the Regional Court of Hechingen settled the estate dispute: Georg Friedrich was affirmed as the head of the house and principal heir under Louis Ferdinand's will, while the remaining children and heirs received their statutory compulsory shares (Pflichtteil) of the estate.

== Consorts ==
=== German Empresses (1871–1918) ===
- Augusta of Saxe-Weimar-Eisenach (1811–1890), consort of Emperor William I (tenure 1871–1888)
- Victoria, Princess Royal (1840–1901), consort of Emperor Frederick III (tenure 1888)
- Augusta Victoria of Schleswig-Holstein (1858–1921), first consort of Emperor William II (tenure 1888–1918)

=== Post-1918 Consorts of the Heads of the House ===
- Hermine Reuss of Greiz (1887–1947), second wife of Wilhelm II (married 1922)
- Duchess Cecilie of Mecklenburg-Schwerin (1886–1954), wife of Crown Prince Wilhelm
- Grand Duchess Kira Kirillovna of Russia (1909–1967), wife of Prince Louis Ferdinand
- Princess Sophie of Isenburg (born 1978), wife of Prince Georg Friedrich

== See also ==
- German State Crown
- Crown of Wilhelm II
- List of heads of state of Germany
- List of heirs to the Prussian throne
- List of monarchs of Prussia
- List of Prussian consorts
