= Hohenzollern (disambiguation) =

Hohenzollern may refer to:

- House of Hohenzollern, German dynasty which ruled Brandenburg-Prussia, Germany, and Romania, among other states
- County of Hohenzollern, the ancestral possession of the dynasty
- House of Hohenzollern-Sigmaringen, a cadet branch of the Hohenzollern dynasty
- House of Hohenzollern-Hechingen, the seniormost branch of the Hohenzollern dynasty
- House of Hohenzollern-Haigerloch, medieval German county
- Burg Hohenzollern, Swabian castle and ancestral seat of the Hohenzollern dynasty
- Province of Hohenzollern (1850–1945), Prussian province
- Hohenzollern (mountain), Baden-Württemberg, Germany
- Hohenzollern (ship), yachts of the German Emperors
- House Order of Hohenzollern, chivalric order
- Crown of Wilhelm II, also known as the Hohenzollern Crown
- Hohenzollern Locomotive Works, a German locomotive-building company
- Württemberg-Hohenzollern (1945–1952), a state of West Germany

== See also ==
- Battle of the Hohenzollern Redoubt, battle of World War One (25 September – 15 October 1915)
