= Princess Marie-Cécile of Prussia =

German noblewoman (1942–2026)

- Duchess of Oldenburg
- Marie-Cécile in 1992
- Born: 28 May 1942; Cadinen, Gau East Prussia, Nazi Germany
- Died: 31 October 2026 (aged 84); Sievershagen, Schleswig-Holstein, Germany
- Spouse: Duke Friedrich August of Oldenburg (m. 1965; div. 1989)
- Issue: Duke Paul-Wladimir; Duchess Rixa; Duchess Bibiane
Names
- Marie-Cécile Kira Viktoria Luise
- House: Hohenzollern
- Father: Louis Ferdinand, Prince of Prussia
- Mother: Grand Duchess Kira Kirillovna of Russia

Princess Marie-Cécile of Prussia (28 May 1942 – 31 October 2026), also known as Marie-Cécile, Duchess of Oldenburg, was a German member of the House of Hohenzollern. She was the eldest daughter of Louis Ferdinand, Prince of Prussia, and Grand Duchess Kira Kirillovna of Russia, and a great-granddaughter of Wilhelm II, German Emperor. In 1965 she married Duke Friedrich August of Oldenburg, with whom she had three children. She later became involved in charitable activities, particularly through the Princess Kira of Prussia Foundation and the Lübeck branch of Live Music Now.

== Early life and family ==
Marie-Cécile was born on 28 May 1942 at the family estate of Cadinen in Gau East Prussia, then part of Germany. Her full name was Marie-Cécile Kira Viktoria Luise. Her parents had moved to the estate in 1941, after her father was entrusted with the administration of the property, which had belonged to her great-grandfather, the former German Emperor Wilhelm II. She was the eldest daughter and third child of their seven children.

Her paternal grandparents were Wilhelm, German Crown Prince, and Duchess Cecilie of Mecklenburg-Schwerin. Her maternal grandparents were Grand Duke Kirill Vladimirovich of Russia and Princess Victoria Melita of Saxe-Coburg and Gotha. Through her maternal grandmother, who was a granddaughter of Queen Victoria, Marie-Cécile was descended from the British royal family.

Her early childhood was shaped by the final years of the Second World War. In January 1945, as the Red Army advanced into East Prussia, the family was forced to leave Cadinen. On 25 January, only hours before Soviet troops reached the estate, her father and family escaped by horse-drawn sleigh across the frozen Vistula Lagoon, also known as the Frisches Haff. The flight marked the end of the family's life at Cadinen and the loss of their East Prussian home.

The family travelled west through Germany as the war ended. After a period in Bad Kissingen, they settled in Bremen in 1947. In 1950 they moved to the Wümmehof estate, which became the family's long-term home. Her father, who became head of the House of Hohenzollern in 1951, subsequently concentrated on the family's remaining properties and the restoration of Hohenzollern Castle.

Marie-Cécile's siblings were Friedrich Wilhelm, Michael, Kira, Louis Ferdinand, Christian-Sigismund and Xenia. In June 1952, her parents established the Princess Kira of Prussia Foundation, which provided holidays at Hohenzollern Castle for children and young people affected by the difficult conditions in post-war Germany. The first children, arriving from Berlin, took part in the programme in the summer of 1954.

== Marriage and children ==
On 3 December 1965, Marie-Cécile married Duke Friedrich August of Oldenburg in Berlin. The wedding celebrations attracted considerable public attention and were covered by the German press and television. A reception was held at Charlottenburg Palace, attended by numerous members of European high nobility, as well as Willy Brandt, the Governing Mayor of Berlin, and other political figures. The celebrations were documented by the regional broadcaster RBB in its Berliner Abendschau news programme.

The religious wedding ceremony took place on 4 December at the Kaiser Wilhelm Memorial Church in Berlin. The service was conducted according to the traditional Prussian liturgy at the request of Marie-Cécile's father, Louis Ferdinand, Prince of Prussia. Thousands of people lined the streets to witness the arrival of the Hohenzollern family and their guests. Following the ceremony, the newlyweds travelled to Villa Monbijou in Berlin-Halensee, where they were greeted by further crowds of well-wishers.

The wedding also received extensive coverage in the illustrated press. The 15 December 1965 issue of Bunte featured Marie-Cécile and her marriage to Friedrich August on its cover, describing the occasion as Berlin's most splendid wedding of the year. Photographs of the wedding were also preserved in the photographic collection of the National Archives of the Netherlands, under the title Huwelijk prinses Marie-Cécile van Pruisen met hertog Frederik August van Oldenburg.

Friedrich August was the son of Nikolaus, Hereditary Grand Duke of Oldenburg, and Princess Helena of Waldeck and Pyrmont. He worked as an agricultural expert and development consultant.

Following their marriage, the couple lived in Sierra Leone, where Friedrich August worked as a development consultant in the capital, Freetown. Contemporary wedding coverage reported that they intended to establish their home in Africa.

The couple had three children:

- Paul-Wladimir Nikolaus Louis Ferdinand Peter Max Karl-Emich, Duke of Oldenburg (born 16 August 1969 in Lübeck) married María Méndez de Vigo in a civil ceremony on 18 January 2001 in Wertheim, Germany, and in a religious ceremony on 20 January 2001 at Bronnbach Abbey, Bronnbach an der Tauber, Germany. They have five children together.
- Rixa Marie-Alix Kira Altburg, Duchess of Oldenburg (born 17 September 1970 in Lübeck) married Stephan Sanders on 13 October 2012 at Nienstedten Church in Hamburg-Nienstedten, Germany. They have no children.
- Bibiane Maria Alexandra Gertrud, Duchess of Oldenburg (born 24 June 1974) married Peter Dorner on 22 May 2004 at the Protestant Christuskirche in Merano, Italy. They have three children together.

The marriage ended in divorce in 1989.

== Public and charitable activities ==
Marie-Cécile maintained a longstanding association with charitable and cultural initiatives, particularly those supporting children, young people and access to music. She supported the work of the Princess Kira of Prussia Foundation, established by her parents in 1952 in memory of her mother, Grand Duchess Kira of Russia. The foundation provided holidays at Hohenzollern Castle for children and young people affected by social and economic disadvantage, offering opportunities to participate in recreational, educational and creative activities. Its programme included music, literature, arts and excursions. Marie-Cécile's support for the foundation was acknowledged by the House of Hohenzollern following her death.

She was a founding member of the Lübeck branch of Live Music Now, a charitable organisation established by violinist Yehudi Menuhin to bring live classical music to people who might otherwise have limited access to performances and to support young musicians. The Lübeck association arranged concerts in institutions including schools and facilities for people with disabilities. Its programme enabled selected young musicians to perform outside conventional concert venues, bringing music to audiences in hospitals, care homes, hospices and other community settings.

Marie-Cécile continued her involvement with the Lübeck association over subsequent years, serving as a deputy chairwoman and helping to organise performances throughout the region.

She remained associated with Live Music Now Lübeck until her death; she was one of its deputy chairwomen, and the House of Hohenzollern acknowledged her charitable commitments in its announcement of her death.

== Later life and death ==
In later life, Marie-Cécile lived in the Ostholstein district of Schleswig-Holstein, northern Germany. She retained an interest in the history of the Hohenzollern family and participated in historical and cultural events.

Marie-Cécile died on 31 October 2026 at her residence in Sievershagen, a locality within the municipality of Manhagen in Schleswig-Holstein, Germany, at the age of 84. The House of Hohenzollern announced her death and paid tribute to her charitable commitments, including her work with the Princess Kira of Prussia Foundation and Live Music Now Lübeck. Her funeral service and burial took place on 13 November 2026 at St. Katharinen Church in Lensahn, Schleswig-Holstein.
