= Michael Prinz von Preussen =

German writer (1940–2014)

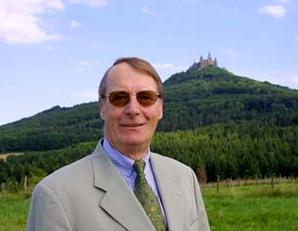
- Born: 22 March 1940; Berlin, Nazi Germany
- Died: 3 April 2014 (aged 74)
- Burial: 11 April 2014; Hohenzollern Castle, Baden-Württemberg, Germany
- Spouse: Jutta Jörn (m. 1966; div. 1982) Brigitte Wegner von Dallwitz (m. 1982)
- Issue: 2
Names
- Wilhelm Heinrich Michael Louis Ferdinand Friedrich Franz Wladimir
- House: Hohenzollern
- Father: Louis Ferdinand, Prince of Prussia
- Mother: Grand Duchess Kira Kirillovna of Russia

Wilhelm Heinrich Michael Louis Ferdinand Friedrich Franz Wladimir Prinz von Preussen (22 March 1940 – 3 April 2014) was a descendant of the Hohenzollern dynasty which ruled Germany until the end of World War I. His great-grandfather Wilhelm II was the German Emperor and King of Prussia until 1918. Although Kaiser Wilhelm died in exile and his family was stripped of much of its wealth and recognition of its rank and titles by the German Republic, Michael spent nearly all of his life in Germany.

== Biography ==
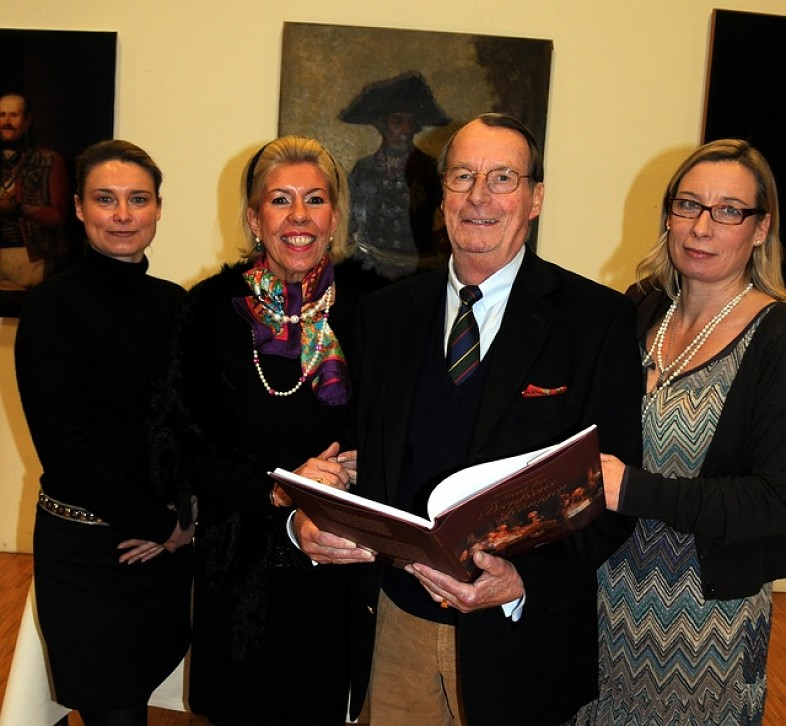
Michael Prince of Prussia, his wife Brigitte, and his daughters

Michael was the second son of Louis Ferdinand, Prince of Prussia, and Grand Duchess Kira Kirillovna of Russia. Both of his parents lived their early years as members of ruling imperial families that were deposed before they reached adulthood, leaving them to adjust to life in straitened circumstances, in exile or under surveillance, and sometimes in flight from their ancestral nations. The Kaiser lived in the Netherlands under banishment from Germany when Michael was born. However, by the time Michael was ten years old, both his great-grandfather and grandfather had died, leaving his father as the Hohenzollern pater familias, whom German monarchists recognized as their rightful emperor and king. Michael was born in Berlin, but grew up in Bremen. He studied in Freiburg and worked later for several multinational corporations. He also wrote several history books.

Having made the decision to contract a non-dynastic marriage, he submitted to his father (then head of the family) a renunciation on behalf of himself and his future descendants to the family's claim to the defunct thrones of Imperial Germany and Royal Prussia, executed at Bremen on 29 August 1966. On 23 September 1966, he married in Düsseldorf Roman Catholic commoner Jutta Jörn (born in Gießen, 27 January 1943), an administrative assistant. The couple had two daughters together. Michael and Jutta divorced on 18 March 1982.

On 23 June 1982, he married secondly in Bad Soden am Taunus, again non-dynastically, to Roman Catholic commoner Brigitte Dallwitz-Wegner (born in Kitzbühel, Austria, 17 September 1939 – 14 October 2016), granddaughter of German aeronautical engineer Richard Wegner von Dallwitz (1873–1945), also known as Richard von Dallwitz-Wegner. The couple had no children.

Along with his elder brother, Michael eventually repudiated the implications of his renunciation claiming, in a lawsuit against his nephew Georg Friedrich Prinz von Preussen, that the forfeiture of an equal share with his siblings in the family's remaining fortune, the bulk of which had been placed in a trust for William II's heir, was discriminatory.

Michael was the godfather of Georg Friedrich Prinz von Preussen.

He died on 3 April 2014, aged 74. Two years later, his widow, Brigitte, died by suicide.

== Books in German ==
- Ein Preußenprinz zu sein, Munich 1986
- Auf den Spuren der deutschen Monarchien, Cologne 2008
- Zu Gast bei Preußens Königen, Cologne 2009
- Die Staufer: Herrscher einer glanzvollen Epoche, Cologne 2010
- Die Preußen am Rhein: Burgen, Schlösser, Rheinromantik, Cologne 2011
- Friedrich der Große, Cologne 2011

== Ancestry ==
Ancestors of Michael Prinz von Preussen

8. Wilhelm II, German Emperor
4. Wilhelm, German Crown Prince
9. Princess Augusta Victoria of Schleswig-Holstein-Sonderburg-Augustenburg
2. Louis Ferdinand, Prince of Prussia
10. Frederick Francis III, Grand Duke of Mecklenburg-Schwerin
5. Duchess Cecilie of Mecklenburg-Schwerin
11. Grand Duchess Anastasia Mikhailovna of Russia
1. Michael Prince of Prussia
12. Grand Duke Vladimir Alexandrovich of Russia
6. Cyril Vladimirovich, Grand Duke of Russia
13. Duchess Marie of Mecklenburg-Schwerin
3. Grand Duchess Kira Kirillovna of Russia
14. Alfred, Duke of Saxe-Coburg and Gotha
7. Princess Victoria Melita of Saxe-Coburg and Gotha
15. Grand Duchess Maria Alexandrovna of Russia
