= Duke Friedrich August of Oldenburg =

German duke (1936–2017)

- Born: 11 January 1936; Rastede, Oldenburg, Germany
- Died: 9 July 2017 (aged 81); Merano
- Spouse: Princess Marie Cécile of Prussia (m. 1965; div. 1989) Countess Donata of Castell-Rüdenhausen (m. 1991; died 2015)
- Issue: Duke Paul-Wladimir; Duchess Rixa; Duchess Bibiane
Names
- German: Friedrich August Wilhelm Christian Ernst
- House: Holstein-Gottorp
- Father: Nikolaus, Hereditary Grand Duke of Oldenburg
- Mother: Princess Helena of Waldeck and Pyrmont

Duke Friedrich August of Oldenburg (11 January 1936 – 9 July 2017) was a member of the House of Holstein-Gottorp. He is a son of Nikolaus, Hereditary Grand Duke of Oldenburg and Princess Helena of Waldeck and Pyrmont.

== Family and early life ==
Frederich August is the sixth child and fourth son of Nikolaus, Hereditary Grand Duke of Oldenburg and his first wife Princess Helena of Waldeck and Pyrmont. His paternal grandparents are Frederick Augustus II, Grand Duke of Oldenburg and Duchess Elisabeth Alexandrine of Mecklenburg-Schwerin. His maternal grandparents are Friedrich, Prince of Waldeck and Pyrmont and Princess Bathildis of Schaumburg-Lippe.

His grandfather was overthrown as Grand Duke of Oldenburg in 1918, at the end of World War I. His father Nikolaus thus never legally succeeded to the title when the deposed Grand Duke died in 1931. Friedrich is an uncle of Christian, Duke of Oldenburg, the current head of the House of Oldenburg.

== Marriage and issue ==
Friedrich August's first wife was Princess Marie Cécile of Prussia, a daughter of Louis Ferdinand, Prince of Prussia (second son of William, German Crown Prince) and his wife, Grand Duchess Kira Kirillovna of Russia. They married in Berlin in a civil ceremony on 3 December 1965 and a religious ceremony the following day. He was working as an agricultural expert. The ceremony was the first Hohenzollern marriage in Berlin since 1913.

Friedrich August and Marie-Cécile have three children: a son, and two daughters. Marie-Cécile and Friedrich August divorced on 23 November 1989. On 9 February 1991, Friedrich August was remarried to Donata Countess of Castell-Rüdenhausen in Rüdenhausen, Germany. She was the widow of Marie-Cécile's brother, Louis Ferdinand Prince of Prussia (1944 - 1977) (son of Louis Ferdinand, Prince of Prussia - 1907 - 1994) and mother of Prince Georg Friedrich of Prussia (the current Head of the Royal House of Prussia). Donata died at Traunstein on 5 September 2015 after a long illness.

== Ancestry ==
Ancestors of Duke Friedrich August of Oldenburg

8. Peter II, Grand Duke of Oldenburg
4. Frederick Augustus II, Grand Duke of Oldenburg
9. Princess Elisabeth of Saxe-Altenburg
2. Nikolaus, Hereditary Grand Duke of Oldenburg
10. Frederick Francis II, Grand Duke of Mecklenburg-Schwerin
5. Duchess Elisabeth of Mecklenburg-Schwerin
11. Princess Marie of Schwarzburg-Rudolstadt
1. Duke Friedrich August of Oldenburg
12. George Victor, Prince of Waldeck and Pyrmont
6. Friedrich, Prince of Waldeck and Pyrmont
13. Princess Helena of Nassau
3. Princess Helena of Waldeck and Pyrmont
14. Prince William of Schaumburg-Lippe
7. Princess Bathildis of Schaumburg-Lippe
15. Princess Bathildis of Anhalt-Dessau
