= Princess Kira of Prussia =

Prussian royal (1943–2004)

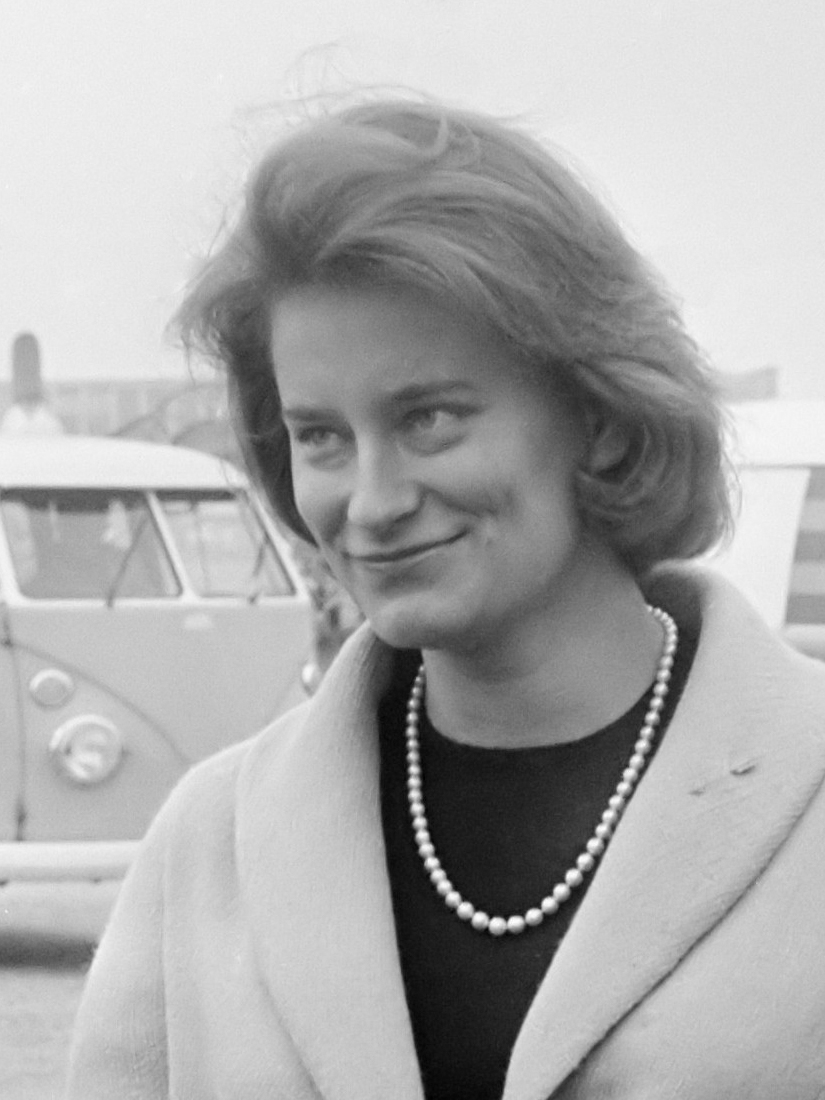
- Kira in 1966
- Born: 27 June 1943; Cadienen, East Prussia, Nazi Germany
- Died: 10 January 2004 (aged 60); Berlin, Germany
- Burial: 24 January 2004; Hohenzollern Castle
- Spouse: Thomas Liepsner (m. 1973; div. 1984)
- Issue: Kira-Marina von Bismarck
Names
- Kira Auguste Viktoria Friederike
- House: Hohenzollern
- Father: Louis Ferdinand, Prince of Prussia
- Mother: Grand Duchess Kira Kirillovna of Russia

Princess Kira Auguste Viktoria Friederike of Prussia (27 June 1943 – 10 January 2004) was the fourth child and second daughter of Louis Ferdinand, Prince of Prussia and Grand Duchess Kira Kirillovna of Russia. Princess Kira was born in Cadienen, East Prussia (today Kadyny, Poland).

She married Thomas Frank Liepsner on 10 September 1973 in a civil ceremony. The religious ceremony was held the next day at Felizenweil. They were divorced in 1984. They had one daughter, Kira-Marina Liepsner (born 22 January 1977), who married Andreas Felix Paul von Bismarck (31 January 1979 – 31 October 2019) (a distant relative of the Princes of Bismark) on 7 May 2005 in St. Peter and Paul Church on Nikolskoë, Berlin. Kira-Marina and Andreas had two daughters, Princess Kira’s granddaughters.

When her father died in 1994, Princess Kira took his seat on the board of the Kissinger Sommer classical music festival. She died in Berlin after a long illness. Her urn was buried in Hohenzollern Castle.

== Ancestry ==
Ancestors of Princess Kira of Prussia

8. Wilhelm II, German Emperor
4. Wilhelm, German Crown Prince
9. Augusta Viktoria of Schleswig-Holstein-Sonderburg-Augustenburg
2. Louis Ferdinand, Prince of Prussia
10. Frederick Francis III, Grand Duke of Mecklenburg-Schwerin
5. Duchess Cecilie of Mecklenburg-Schwerin
11. Grand Duchess Anastasia Mikhailovna of Russia
1. Princess Kira of Prussia
12. Grand Duke Vladimir Alexandrovich of Russia
6. Cyril Vladimirovich, Grand Duke of Russia
13. Duchess Marie of Mecklenburg-Schwerin
3. Grand Duchess Kira Kirillovna of Russia
14. Alfred, Duke of Saxe-Coburg and Gotha
7. Princess Victoria Melita of Saxe-Coburg and Gotha
15. Grand Duchess Maria Alexandrovna of Russia
