= Bicycle monarchy =

Informal style of monarchy in Scandinavia and the Low Countries

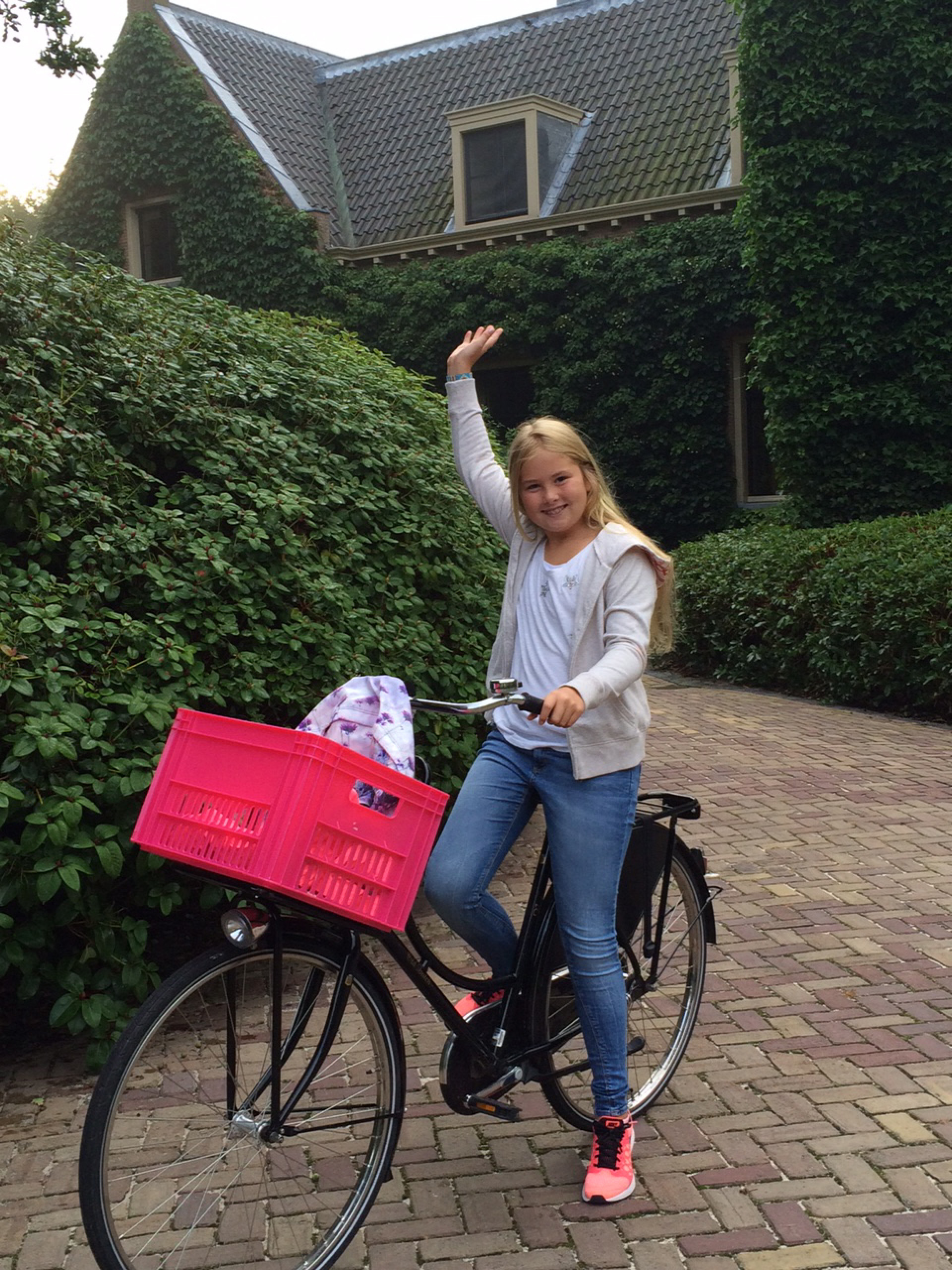
Catharina-Amalia, Princess of Orange, on a bicycle, on her way to school (2015)

In British English, a bicycle monarchy or bicycling monarchy is the more informal and modest personal style of the royal families of countries in Scandinavia and the Low Countries, particularly the Netherlands.

The term 'bicycle monarchy' has been used in a pejorative sense by newspapers in the United Kingdom, reflecting pride in the pomp and ceremony of the British monarchy. However, it is also used favourably, particularly by those who oppose the more ceremonial side of the royal family but do not seek to abolish the monarchy.

== Origin ==
There are two conflicting claims of the origin of the epithet: one deriving from the Dutch monarchy and the other from the Danish monarchy.

The version involving the Netherlands has its roots in Queen Juliana's love of riding bicycles, even during her reign. Although Juliana would still perform official ceremonies, she was more famous in the United Kingdom for her frequent unscheduled appearances with members of the public. Her daughter, Queen Beatrix, has also been sighted on her bicycle although less often than her mother, which perpetuates the "bicycle monarchy" image in the foreign imagination.

The possible reference to the Danish monarchy stems from the German occupation of Denmark during the Second World War. The non-hostile relationship between the governments of Denmark and Germany prompted accusations of collaboration. In a show of solidarity with the Danish people in the face of such claims, the future King Frederik IX and Queen Ingrid began taking bicycle rides around Copenhagen.

Whatever gave rise to the term, it was not a result of either poverty or lack of constitutional authority. For example, the Dutch monarch, to whom the term is most frequently applied, retains full royal prerogative powers and has a personal wealth of $250 million.

In interviews with C.L. Sulzberger for his 1977 book The Fall of Eagles, Prince Louis Ferdinand of Prussia, the grandson and heir of former German Emperor Wilhelm II, expressed a deep sense of admiration for the informal bicycle monarchy and crowned republic style, which are favoured and used by the Dutch, Belgian, and Scandinavian royal families. Praising how even vehicles carrying the King or Queen would stop and wait at traffic lights, Louis Ferdinand stated that if the House of Hohenzollern were ever restored to the German throne during his lifetime, the same informality would be a quality that he fully intended to emulate.
