= Hohenzollern (mountain) =

Mountain in Baden-Württemberg, Germany

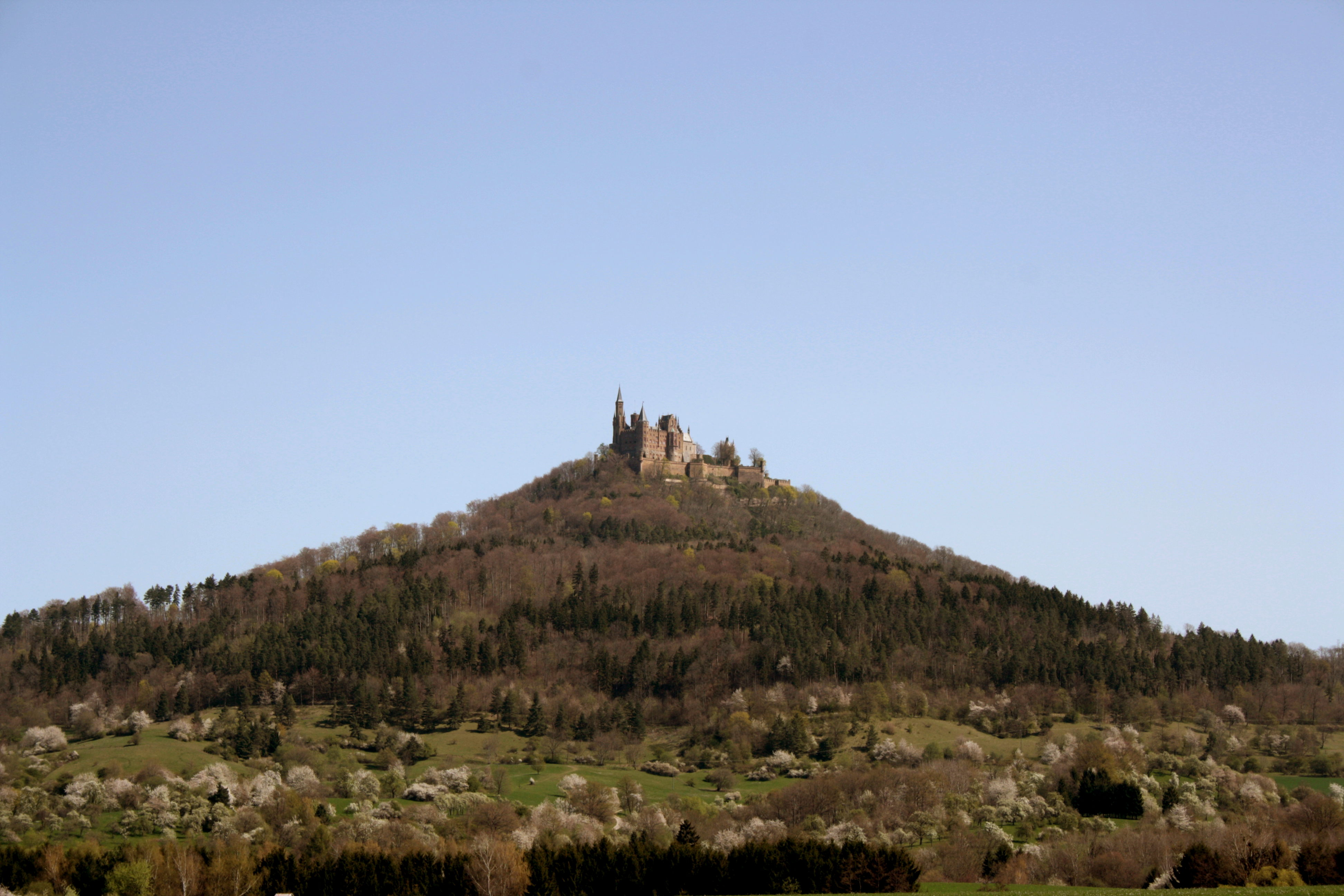
- View of Hohenzollern from the southwest, with Castle Hohenzollern visible on the mountain's summit

Highest point
- Elevation: 855 m (2,805 ft)
- Coordinates: 48°19′23″N 8°58′4″E

Geography
- Location within Germany
- Location: Zollernalbkreis, Baden-Württemberg, Germany
- Parent range: Swabian Jura

Climbing
- Easiest route: Road to parking lot near summit, then stairs to the castle

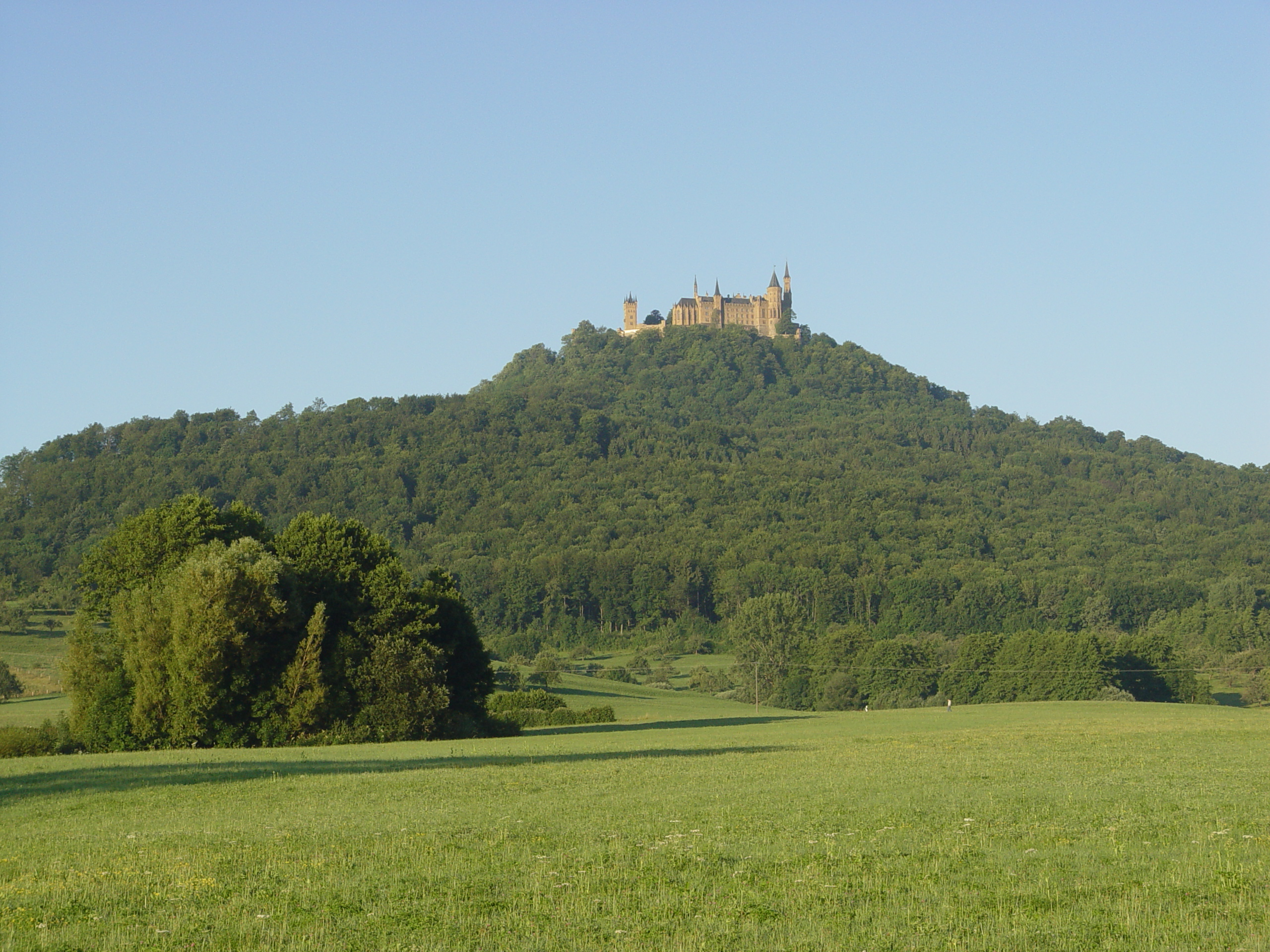
View from north

Hohenzollern is a mountain, 855 m (2,805 ft), of Baden-Württemberg, Germany. It is located in Zollernalbkreis. Hohenzollern Castle is located on its top. The mountain is an outlier, about 1 km (0.62 mi) north of the Swabian Jura.
