= Grand Duchess Kira Kirillovna of Russia =

Princess of Prussia (1909–1967)

Kira Kirillovna of Russia
- Princess of Prussia
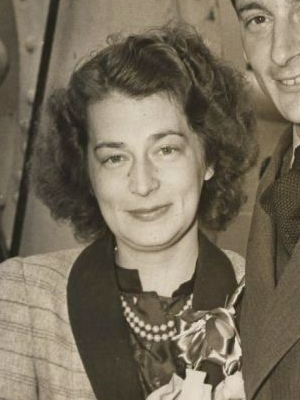
- Princess Kira in 1938

Consort of the Head of the House of Hohenzollern Princess of Prussia
- Tenure: 20 July 1951 - 8 September 1967
- Born: 9 May 1909; Paris, France
- Died: 8 September 1967 (aged 58); Saint-Briac-sur-Mer, Brittany, France
- Burial: 11 September 1967; Hohenzollern Castle, Baden-Württemberg, West Germany
- Spouse: Louis Ferdinand, Prince of Prussia (m. 1938)
- Issue Detail: Prince Friedrich Wilhelm; Prince Michael; Princess Marie Cécile; Princess Kira; Prince Louis Ferdinand; Prince Christian-Sigismund; Princess Xenia
Names
- Kira Kirillovna Romanova
- House: Holstein-Gottorp-Romanov
- Father: Grand Duke Kirill Vladimirovich of Russia
- Mother: Princess Victoria Melita of Saxe-Coburg and Gotha

Grand Duchess Kira Kirillovna of Russia (9 May 1909 – 8 September 1967) was the second daughter of Grand Duke Kirill Vladimirovich of Russia and Princess Victoria Melita of Saxe-Coburg and Gotha. She married Prince Louis Ferdinand of Prussia, grandson of the last German Emperor Wilhelm II.

== Early life ==
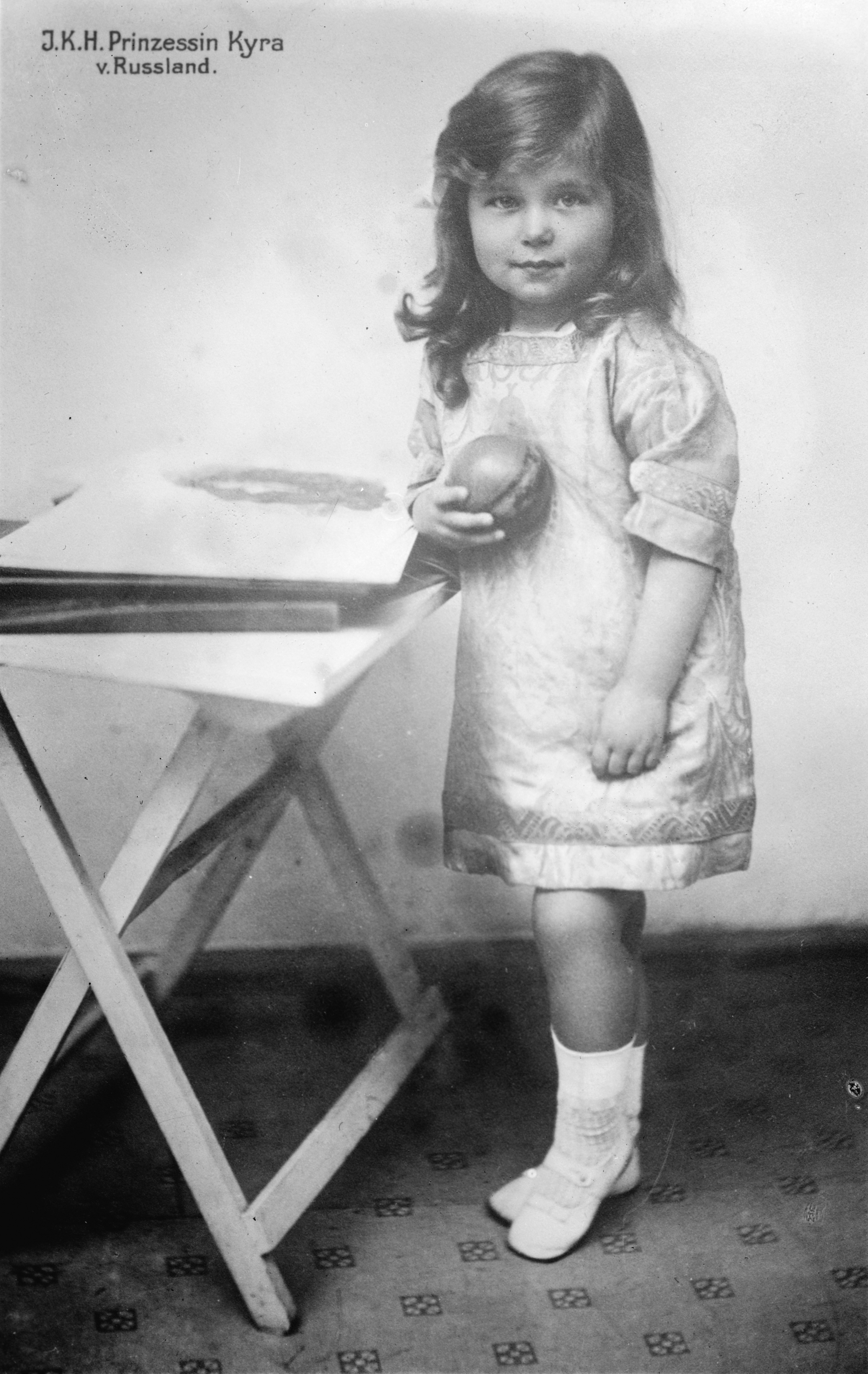
Princess Kira of Russia, ca. 1912

Grand Duchess Kira Kirilovna of Russia was born on 9 May 1909, at her parents' house on Avenue Henri Martin in Paris. Named after her father, she was the second child of Grand Duke Kirill Vladimirovich of Russia, and his wife, Princess Victoria Melita of Saxe-Coburg and Gotha. Her parents were then living in exile because their marriage had not been approved by Tsar Nicholas II due to the fact that they were first cousins. The Russian Orthodox religion forbids the marriage of two first cousins, so they had been forced to live abroad. In addition, her mother had divorced her former husband, Ernest Louis, Grand Duke of Hesse, the brother of the Tsarina Alexandra Feodorovna.

In 1908, after the death of Grand Duke Alexei Alexandrovich and before Kira's birth, Nicholas II restored Kirill to his rank of captain in the Imperial Russian Navy and his position as aide de camp to the emperor.[17] He was given the title Grand Duke of Russia and from then on his wife was styled as Her Imperial Highness Grand Duchess Viktoria Feodorovna. They settled at the Cavalier's house in Tsarskoye Selo as her father, a captain in the Russian Navy, was attached to a nearby naval academy. Kira and her elder sister, Maria, had a privileged childhood. They had an English nanny and learned the languages spoken by the Romanovs: Russian, English, French, and German.

Kira's early years were spent in luxury at her father's palace at 13 Glinka Street in Saint Petersburg, where her parents entertained their guests lavishly. There were family outings with her grandmother at the opulent Vladimir Palace and in the summer at the Vladimir villa in Tsarskoye Selo.

== World War I and Russian Revolution ==
The family was spending the summer of 1914 on their yacht in the Gulf of Finland and were in Riga when the war broke out. During World War I, Kira's father served as the commander of a unit of the Naval Guards, while her mother oversaw a motorized ambulance. At the outbreak of the Russian revolution, Kira's father marched to the Tauride Palace at the head of the Naval Guards before the establishment of the Russian Provisional Government.

Following the Russian Revolution of 1917, the family initially remained living at their palace amid the upheavals. In June, Kira's father obtained permission from the provisional government to move to Finland. Kira, eight at the time, recalled that they rode on a public train. "For the first time there were no royal trappings ... i.e. red carpets, special comforts, etc.," she recalled. In Finland, the family lived at Haiko Manor, Borga (Porvoo). A month later, her 40-year-old mother gave birth to a son, Vladimir. The family waited in Finland, hoping that the White guard would defeat the Bolsheviks and they could return to Russia. The family lived under harsh conditions, with food, fuel and money in short supply. Kira, then age nine, amused herself by taking long walks hunting for mushrooms, and as a treat went to the cinema every Friday. She later recalled feeling homesick and bored. Grand Duke Kirill's family stayed in Finland until May 1920.

== Family ==
The family eventually left Finland and headed first to Coburg and then to Saint-Briac, France. Kira was born Princess Kira Kirillovna of Russia, but her father later gave her illegally the title "Grand Duchess" when he declared himself Guardian of the Throne in 1924. Dowager Empress Maria Feodorovna openly mocked Kirill's pretension. Blonde-haired, blue-eyed Kira, high-spirited and straightforward also had an even temper. She was intelligent, curious, and interested in the arts like her mother, with whom she worked in the art studio at Saint-Briac. Kira also frequently visited her cousins at various royal courts or attended house parties in the United Kingdom.

Princess Kira had some difficulty finding a suitable husband. She was interested in the hemophiliac Alfonso, Prince of Asturias, son of Alfonso XIII of Spain, but was disappointed when the prince showed more interest in one of the daughters of Prince Nicholas of Greece. Later, she was fond of Prince Constantine "Teddy" Soutzo, a Romanian aristocrat. Her cousin Carol II of Romania refused to permit the match for political reasons. Finally, Kira married Prince Louis Ferdinand of Prussia in 1938. They raised a family of four sons and three daughters in a village near Bremen, Germany.

Her children were:

- Prince Friedrich Wilhelm of Prussia (9 February 1939 – 29 September 2015); he married Waltraud Freydag on 22 August 1967 and they were divorced in 1975. They had one son and six grandchildren. He remarried Ehrengard Insea Elisabeth von Reden on 23 April 1976 and they were divorced in 2004. They had three children and one grandson. He remarried, again, Sibylle Gabriele Kretschmer on 23 March 2004.
  - Prince Philipp Kirill Friedrich Wilhelm Moritz Boris Tanko von Preußen (b. 23 April 1968). He married Anna Christine Soltau (b. 1968) on 2 July 1994 and had children:
    - Prince Paul Wilhelm Philipp Friedrich Alois Johannes Mose von Preußen (b. 10 April 1995). He married Melissa Ising in 2019.
    - Princess Marie Luise Anna Philippa Julie Margarethe Elisabeth von Preußen (b. 12 March 1997)
    - Princess Elisabeth Christine Philine Cécilie Annegret Salome Maria von Preußen (b. 16 December 1998)
    - Princess Anna Sophie Phila Wilhelmine Amelie Elisabeth Maria von Preußen (b. 26 March 2001)
    - Princess Johanna Amelie Kira Philippa Rose Elisabeth Maria von Preußen (b. 10 September 2002)
    - Prince Timotheus Friedrich von Preußen (b. 9 June 2005)
  - Prince Friedrich Wilhelm Ludwig Ferdinand Kirill von Preußen (b. 16 August 1979). He married Anna Catharina Freiin (Baroness) von Salza und Lichtenau (b. 1981) on 30 April 2009 and had two children:
    - Prince Friedrich Wilhelm von Preußen (b. 2012)
    - Princess Charlotte von Preußen (b. 2016)
  - Princess Viktoria-Luise Kira Ehrengard von Preußen (b. 2 May 1982). She married Hereditary Prince Ferdinand of Leiningen (b. 1982) on 16 September 2017 and had two daughters:
    - Princess Alexandra Viktoria Luise Ehrengard zu Leiningen (b. 28 February 2020)
    - Princess Feodora zu Leiningen (b. 16 August 2021)
  - Prince Joachim Albrecht Bernhard Christian Ernst von Preußen (b. 26 June 1984). He married Countess Angelina zu Solms-Laubach (b. 1983) on 29 June 2019 and had two children:
    - Princess Georgina von Preußen (b. 2018)
    - Prince Caspian Friedrich Joachim Albrecht von Preußen (b. 2021)
- Prince Michael of Prussia (22 March 1940 – 3 April 2014); he married Jutta Jörn on 23 September 1966 and they were divorced in 1982. They had two daughters and two grandchildren. He remarried Birgitte Dallwitz-Wegner on 23 June 1982.
- Princess Marie Cécile of Prussia (born 28 May 1942 – 31 October 2026); she married Duke Friedrich August of Oldenburg on 3 December 1965 and they were divorced on 23 November 1989. They have three children and eight grandchildren.
- Princess Kira of Prussia (27 June 1943 – 10 January 2004); she married Thomas Liepsner on 10 September 1973 and they were divorced in 1984. They had one daughter and two granddaughters.
- Louis Ferdinand, Hereditary Prince of Prussia (25 August 1944 – 11 July 1977); he married Countess Donata of Castell-Rüdenhausen on 23 May 1975. They had two children (including Georg Friedrich, Prince of Prussia) and four grandchildren.
- Prince Christian-Sigismund of Prussia (b. 14 March 1946); he married Countess Nina von Reventlow (b. 1954) on 29 September 1984. They have two children and he also has another daughter (born out of wedlock):
  - Isabelle-Alexandra von Preußen (b. 18 September 1969); she was born from a relationship of her father with Christiane Grandmontagne (later Countess Jan Bernadotte af Wisborg)
  - Prince Christian-Ludwig of Prussia (b. 16 May 1986); he married Desiree Freiin von Künsberg (b. 1988) on 29 April 2023
  - Princess Irina of Prussia (b. 4 July 1988)
- Princess Xenia of Prussia (9 December 1949 – 18 January 1992); she married Per-Edvard Lithander on 27 January 1973 and they were divorced in 1978. They had two sons and six grandchildren.

== After World War II ==
Kira was called upon to testify in the case of Anna Anderson, the woman who claimed to be Grand Duchess Anastasia Nikolaevna of Russia. Kira had met Anderson briefly in 1952 at the urging of her mother-in-law, Crown Princess Cecilie of Prussia, who believed Anderson's claim. Kira was not convinced. She found the woman "repellent" and "not a lady" and incapable of speaking the cultured English used by her family. Kira had last seen Anastasia when she was a child of seven. Kira's uncle, Grand Duke Andrei Vladimirovich of Russia had been convinced Anderson was Anastasia, but her father and mother were unconvinced by Anderson's claim.

In later years, Kira was disappointed when her eldest son, Friedrich Wilhelm, renounced his rights to the title and married a commoner. She also paid little heed to her health, putting on weight and suffering from high blood pressure in her fifties. She was in good spirits on a visit to her brother Grand Duke Vladimir of Russia at Saint-Briac in September 1967, where she ate well and dumped several spoonfuls of sugar into her coffee, commenting, "God forbid I should eat anything healthy!" That night, she suffered a heart attack and soon died.

== Sources ==
- Peter Kurth, Anastasia: The Riddle of Anna Anderson, Back Bay Books, 1983, ISBN 0-316-50717-2
- Michael John Sullivan, A Fatal Passion: The Story of the Uncrowned Last Empress of Russia, Random House, 1997, ISBN 0-679-42400-8
- John Van der Kiste, Princess Victoria Melita, Sutton Publishing, 1991, ISBN 0-7509-3469-7

Grand Duchess Kira Kirillovna of Russia House of Holstein-Gottorp-Romanov Cadet branch of the House of Oldenburg Born: 9 May 1909 Died: 8 September 1967
Titles in pretence
Preceded by Duchess Cecilie of Mecklenburg-Schwerin	— TITULAR — German Empress; Queen of Prussia; 20 July 1951 – 8 September 1967; Reason for succession failure: German monarchies abolished in 1918	Vacant Title next held by Princess Sophie of Isenburg
