= Louis Ferdinand, Prince of Prussia =

German prince (1907–1994)

Louis Ferdinand
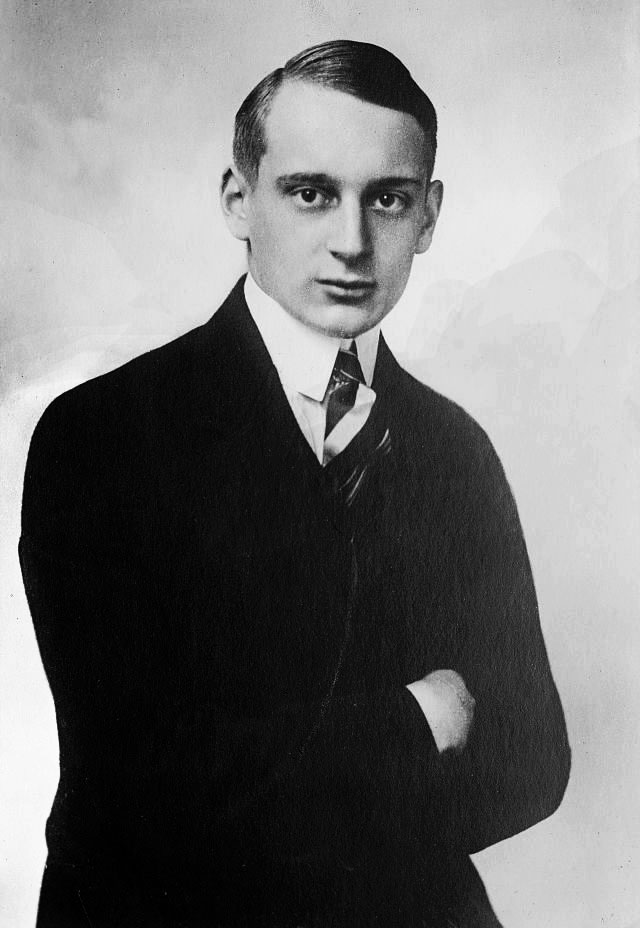
- Studio portrait, c. 1927

Head of the House of Hohenzollern and Prince of Prussia
- Tenure: 20 July 1951 – 26 September 1994
- Predecessor: Wilhelm
- Successor: Georg Friedrich
- Born: 9 November 1907; Marmorpalais, Potsdam, German Empire
- Died: 26 September 1994 (aged 86); Bremen, Germany
- Burial: 1 October 1994; Hohenzollern Castle, Baden-Württemberg, Germany
- Spouse: Grand Duchess Kira Kirillovna of Russia (m. 1938; died 1967)
- Issue: Prince Friedrich Wilhelm; Prince Michael; Princess Marie Cécile; Princess Kira; Prince Louis Ferdinand; Prince Christian-Sigismund; Princess Xenia
Names
- Louis Ferdinand Victor Eduard Adalbert Michael Hubertus Prinz von Preußen
- House: Hohenzollern
- Father: Crown Prince Wilhelm of Germany
- Mother: Duchess Cecilie of Mecklenburg-Schwerin

Louis Ferdinand, Prince of Prussia (German: Louis Ferdinand Victor Eduard Adalbert Michael Hubertus Prinz von Preußen; 9 November 1907 – 26 September 1994) was a grandson of Kaiser Wilhelm II and member of the House of Hohenzollern, which occupied the Prussian and German thrones until the abolition of those monarchies in 1918. He was also noteworthy as a businessman and patron of the arts.

== Biography ==
Louis Ferdinand was born in Potsdam as the third in succession to the throne of the German Empire, after his father, German Crown Prince William and elder brother Prince Wilhelm of Prussia. The monarchy was abolished after Germany's revolution in 1918. When Louis Ferdinand's older brother Prince Wilhelm renounced his succession rights to marry a member of the untitled nobility in 1933 (he was later to be killed in action in France in 1940 while fighting in the German army), Louis Ferdinand replaced him as second in the line of succession to the defunct German and Prussian thrones after the former Crown Prince.

Louis Ferdinand was educated in Berlin and deviated from his family's tradition by not pursuing a military career. Instead, he travelled extensively and settled for some time in Detroit, where he befriended Henry Ford and became acquainted with Franklin D. Roosevelt, among others. He held a great interest in engineering. Recalled from the United States upon his brother's renunciation of the throne, he became involved in the German aviation industry, but was barred by Hitler from taking any active part in German military activities.

Louis Ferdinand dissociated himself from the Nazis after this. He was not involved in the 20 July plot against Hitler in 1944 but was interrogated by the Gestapo immediately afterwards. He was released shortly afterwards.

He married his second cousin, Grand Duchess Kira Kirillovna of Russia, in 1938 in first a Russian Orthodox ceremony in Potsdam and then a Lutheran ceremony in Huis Doorn, Netherlands. Both were great-grandchildren of Friedrich Franz II of Mecklenburg-Schwerin. Kira was the second daughter of Grand Duke Kyril Vladimirovich and Princess Victoria Melita of Saxe-Coburg and Gotha.

The couple had four sons and three daughters. His two eldest sons both renounced their succession rights in order to marry commoners. His third son and heir apparent, Prince Louis Ferdinand, died in 1977 during military maneuvers, and thus his one-year-old grandson Georg Friedrich, Prince of Prussia (son of Prince Louis Ferdinand) became the new heir apparent to the defunct Prussian and German Imperial throne. Upon Louis Ferdinand's death in 1994, Georg Friedrich became the pretender to the defunct thrones and head of the Hohenzollern family.

The prince was a popular figure. In 1968 Der Spiegel reported that in a survey of their readers by Quick magazine about who would be the most honorable person to become President of the Federal Republic of Germany, Louis Ferdinand, the only one of twelve candidates who was not a politician, won with 39.8% before Carlo Schmid and Ludwig Erhard. In a similar survey by the tabloid Bild, readers chose Louis Ferdinand by 55.6%. In an interview with Quick, the prince indicated that he might accept the presidency but would not relinquish his claim to the imperial or Prussian crowns.

After German reunification, he arranged for Prussian King Frederick the Great to be reburied from the Christ Chapel at Hohenzollern Castle to the crypt chamber prepared by Frederick himself on the terrace of his Sanssouci Palace in Potsdam. Instead of complying with his last wish after his death, the king had been laid to rest in the Garrison Church, Potsdam next to his unloved father Frederick William I of Prussia in 1786. Both coffins were relocated during World War II and ended up in the prince's castle in what became West Germany. The prince had Frederick William I's coffin taken to the crypt of the Church of Peace, Potsdam because the Garrison Church had been destroyed in 1945.

In interviews with C.L. Sulzberger for the book The Fall of Eagles, Louis Ferdinand expressed a deep sense of admiration for the informal bicycle monarchy and crowned republic style favored and used by the Dutch, Belgian, and Scandinavian royal families. Praising how vehicles carrying the King or Queen would stop and wait at traffic lights, Louis Ferdinand stated that if the House of Hohenzollern were ever restored to the German throne during his lifetime, this same informality was a quality he fully intended to emulate.

Prince Ferdinand of Hohenzollern, a member of the senior Swabian branch of the Hohenzollern dynasty, Hohenzollern-Sigmaringen, is his godson.

== Honours ==
- (Kingdom of Prussia) House of Hohenzollern: Sovereign Knight of the Imperial Order of the Black Eagle
- (Kingdom of Prussia) House of Hohenzollern: Sovereign Knight Grand Cordon with Collar of the Imperial Order of the Red Eagle
- (Kingdom of Prussia) House of Hohenzollern: Co-Sovereign Knight Grand Cordon with Collar of the Imperial Order of Hohenzollern
- (Kingdom of Bavaria) Bavarian Royal Family Knight of the Royal Order of Saint Hubert
- (Kingdom of Hanover) Hanoverian Royal Family Knight of the Royal Order of Saint George
- (Grand Duchy of Mecklenburg-Schwerin) Mecklenburger-Schwerinese Royal Family Knight Grand Cross with Collar of the Royal Order of the Wendish Crown
- (Kingdom of Saxony) Saxon Royal Family Knight of the Royal Order of the Rue Crown
- (Russia) Russian Imperial Family: Knight of the Imperial Order of Saint Andrew
- (Russia) Russian Imperial Family: Knight of the Imperial Order of Saint Alexander Nevsky

== Ancestry ==
Ancestors of Louis Ferdinand, Prince of Prussia

8. Frederick III, German Emperor
4. Wilhelm II, German Emperor
9. Victoria, Princess Royal
2. Wilhelm, German Crown Prince
10. Frederick VIII, Duke of Schleswig-Holstein
5. Princess Augusta Victoria of Schleswig-Holstein-Sonderburg-Augustenburg
11. Princess Adelheid of Hohenlohe-Langenburg
1. Louis Ferdinand, Prince of Prussia
12. Frederick Francis II, Grand Duke of Mecklenburg-Schwerin
6. Frederick Francis III, Grand Duke of Mecklenburg-Schwerin
13. Princess Augusta Reuss of Köstritz
3. Duchess Cecilie of Mecklenburg-Schwerin
14. Grand Duke Michael Nikolaevich of Russia
7. Grand Duchess Anastasia Mikhailovna of Russia
15. Princess Cecilie of Baden

== Notes ==
Louis Ferdinand, Prince of Prussia House of Hohenzollern Born: 9 November 1907 Died: 26 September 1994
Titles in pretence
Preceded by Crown Prince Wilhelm	— TITULAR — Prince of Prussia; 20 July 1951 – 26 September 1994; Reason for succession failure: Kingdom of Prussia abolished in 1918	Succeeded by Prince Georg Friedrich
