= Georg Friedrich Prinz von Preussen =

Head of the Prussian House of Hohenzollern since 1994

Georg Friedrich Prinz von Preußen
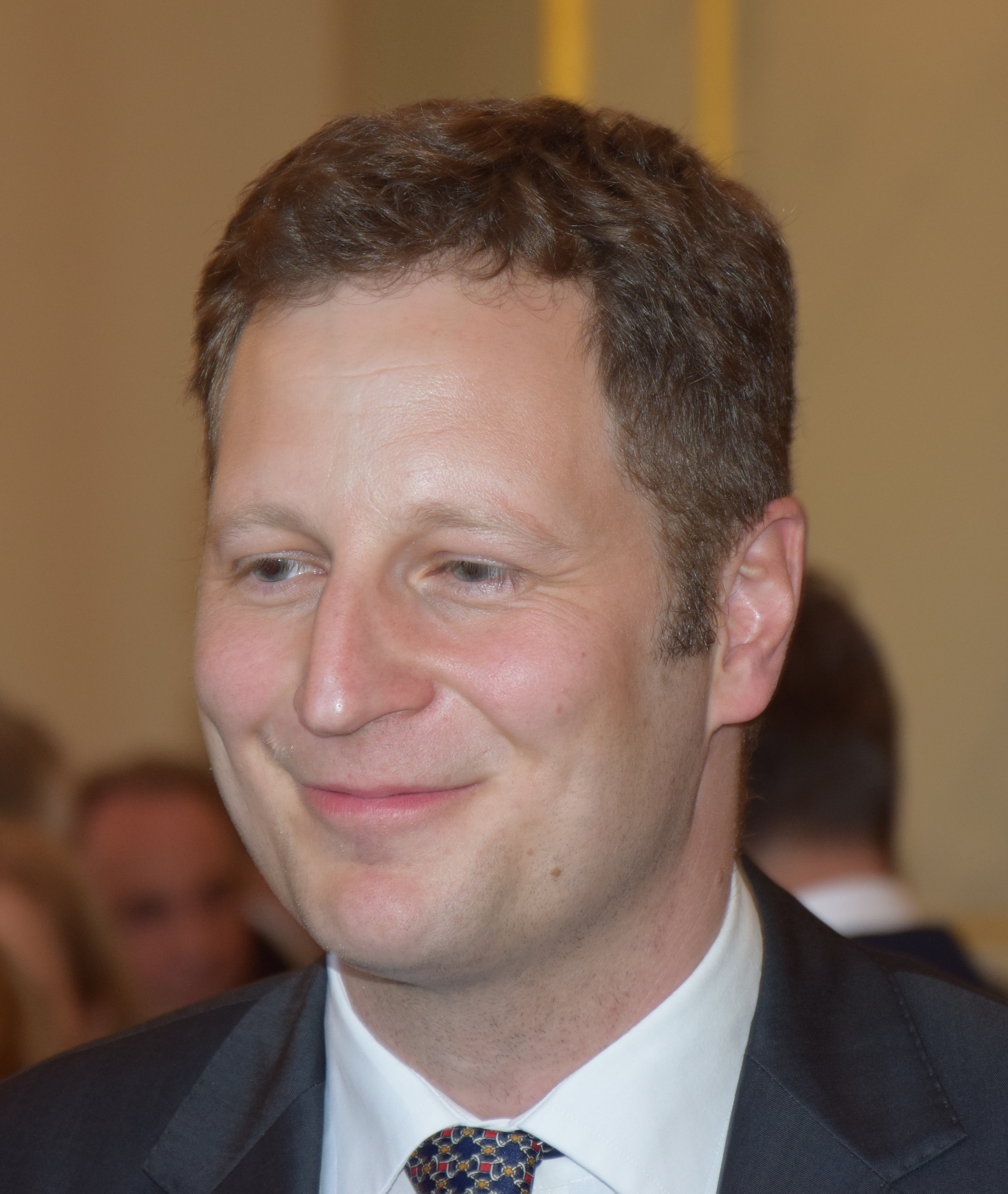
- Georg Friedrich in 2014

Head of the House of Hohenzollern Prince of Prussia
- Tenure: 26 September 1994 – present
- Predecessor: Louis Ferdinand
- Heir apparent: Carl Friedrich
- Born: 10 June 1976 (age 50); Bremen, West Germany
- Spouse: Sophie Prinzessin von Preussen (m. 2011)
- Issue: Carl Friedrich, Hereditary Prinz von Preussen; Prinz Louis Ferdinand von Preussen; Prinzessin Emma Marie von Preussen; Prinz Heinrich Albert von Preussen
Names
- Georg Friedrich Ferdinand Prinz von Preussen
- House: Hohenzollern
- Father: Prinz Louis Ferdinand von Preussen
- Mother: Gräfin Donata von Castell-Rüdenhausen

Georg Friedrich Ferdinand Prinz von Preussen (born 10 June 1976) is a German heir who is the current head of the Prussian branch of the House of Hohenzollern, a dynasty that ruled over the German Empire and the Kingdom of Prussia until near the end of World War I. He is the great-great-grandson of Wilhelm II, the last German Emperor and last King of Prussia, who abdicated and went into exile upon Germany's defeat in World War I in 1918.

He is known to the German public mostly due to his claims against the German State to return former possessions to his family.

== Education and career ==
Georg Friedrich is the only son and eldest child of Louis Ferdinand Prinz von Preussen (1944–1977) and Countess Donata of Castell-Rüdenhausen (1950–2015). Born into a mediatised princely family, his mother later became Duchess Donata of Oldenburg when she married secondly Duke Friedrich August of Oldenburg, who had previously been married to her sister-in-law Princess Marie Cécile of Prussia. His only sister is Cornelie-Cécile (b. 1978).

He attended grammar schools in Bremen and Oldenburg and completed his education at Glenalmond College near Perth, Scotland, where he passed his A-levels. He then served for a two-year commission in the Alpine troops of the Bundeswehr and was discharged after his term of service. Georg Friedrich earned his degree in business economics at the Freiberg University of Mining and Technology.

Georg Friedrich works for a company specialising in helping universities to bring their innovations to market. He also administered the Princess Kira of Prussia Foundation, founded by his grandmother Grand Duchess Kira of Russia in 1952, now administered by his wife. In 2018, he moved from a house near Bremen, where he had also spent his childhood, to Babelsberg, a district of Potsdam, the capital city of the German state of Brandenburg.

Until 30 December 2025, Georg Friedrich owned a two-thirds share of his family's original seat, Hohenzollern Castle, with the head of the Swabian branch, Karl Friedrich, Prince of Hohenzollern, owning the remaining third. In an agreement taking effect on 31 December 2025, Karl Friedrich transferred his share to Georg Friedrich, giving the latter full responsibility for the operation, maintenance and cultural development of the castle. He also owns the Princes' Island in the Great Lake of Plön. In 2017, he founded a beer trademark called Kgl. Preußische Biermanufactur (Royal Prussian Beer Manufactory), producing a Pilsner brand called Preussens.

Georg Friedrich continues to claim compensation for land and palaces in Berlin expropriated from his family, a claim begun in March 1991 by his grandfather, Prince Louis Ferdinand of Prussia, under the Compensation Act (EALG).

== House of Hohenzollern ==
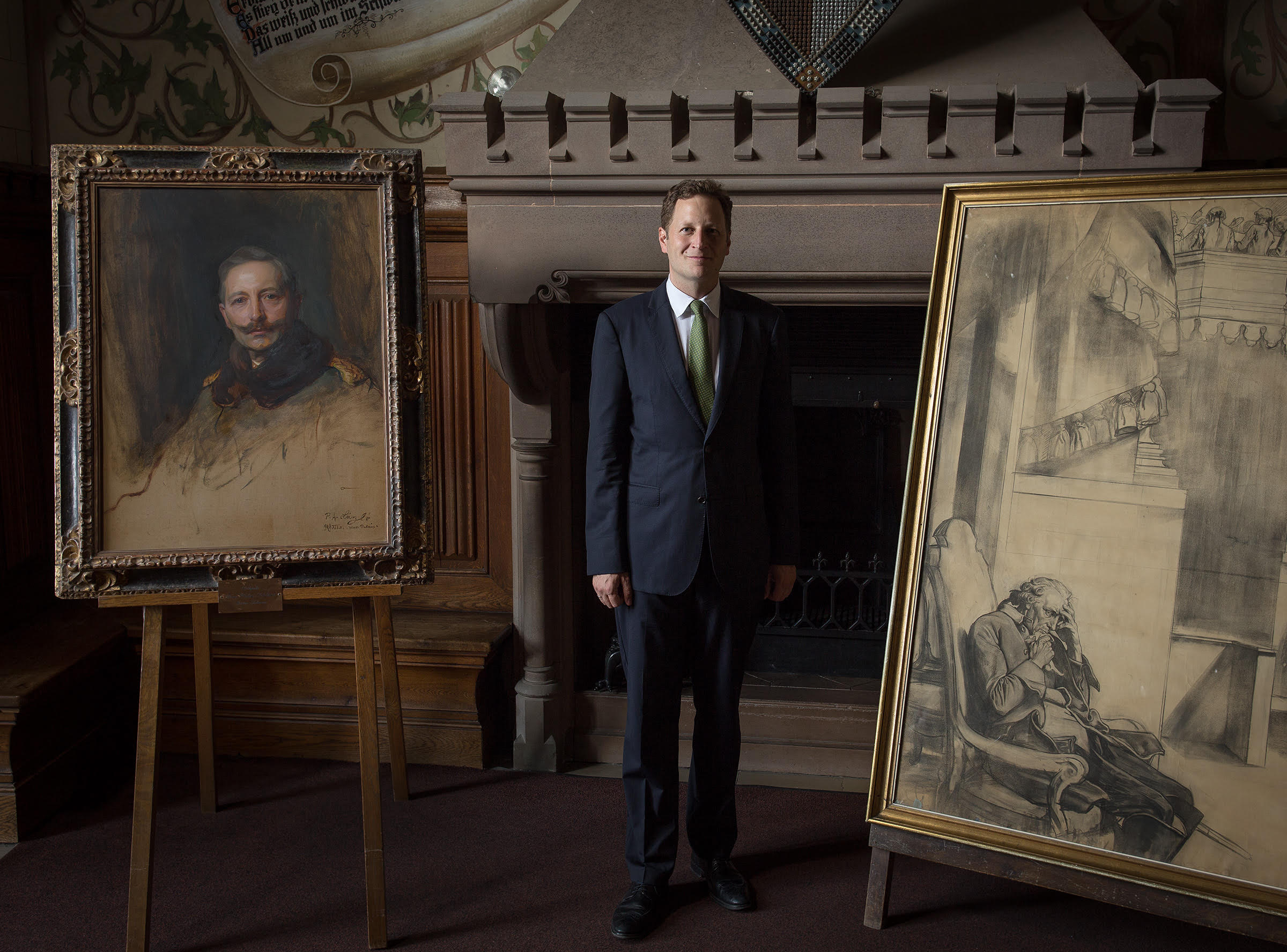
George Friedrich Prinz von Preussen photographed by Oliver Mark in Hohenzollern Castle, Bisingen 2018

Georg Friedrich succeeded his grandfather, Louis Ferdinand, as Head of the Royal House of Prussia, a branch of the House of Hohenzollern, on 26 September 1994. He stated that he learned to appreciate the history and responsibility of his heritage during time spent with his paternal grandfather, who often recounted to him anecdotes from the life in exile of his own grandfather, the last German Kaiser, Wilhelm II.

His position as sole heir to the estate of his grandfather was challenged by his uncles, Friedrich Wilhelm and Michael, who filed a lawsuit claiming that, despite their renunciations as dynasts at the time of their marriages, the loss of their inheritance rights based on their selection of spouse was discriminatory and unconstitutional. His uncles were initially successful, the Regional Court of Hechingen and the higher Regional Court of Stuttgart ruling in their favour in 1997 on the grounds that the requirement to marry equally was "immoral". However, the Federal Court of Justice of Germany overturned the original rulings in favour of Georg Friedrich's uncles, the case being remanded to the courts at Hechingen and Stuttgart. This time both courts ruled in favour of Georg Friedrich. His uncles then took their case to the Federal Constitutional Court of Germany which overruled the previous court rulings in Georg Friedrich's favour, on 22 March 2004. On 19 October 2005, a German regional court ruled that Georg Friedrich was indeed the principal heir of his grandfather, Louis Ferdinand (who was the primary beneficiary of the trust set up for the estate of Wilhelm II), but also concluded that each of the children of Louis Ferdinand was entitled to a portion of the Prussian inheritance.

== Family ==
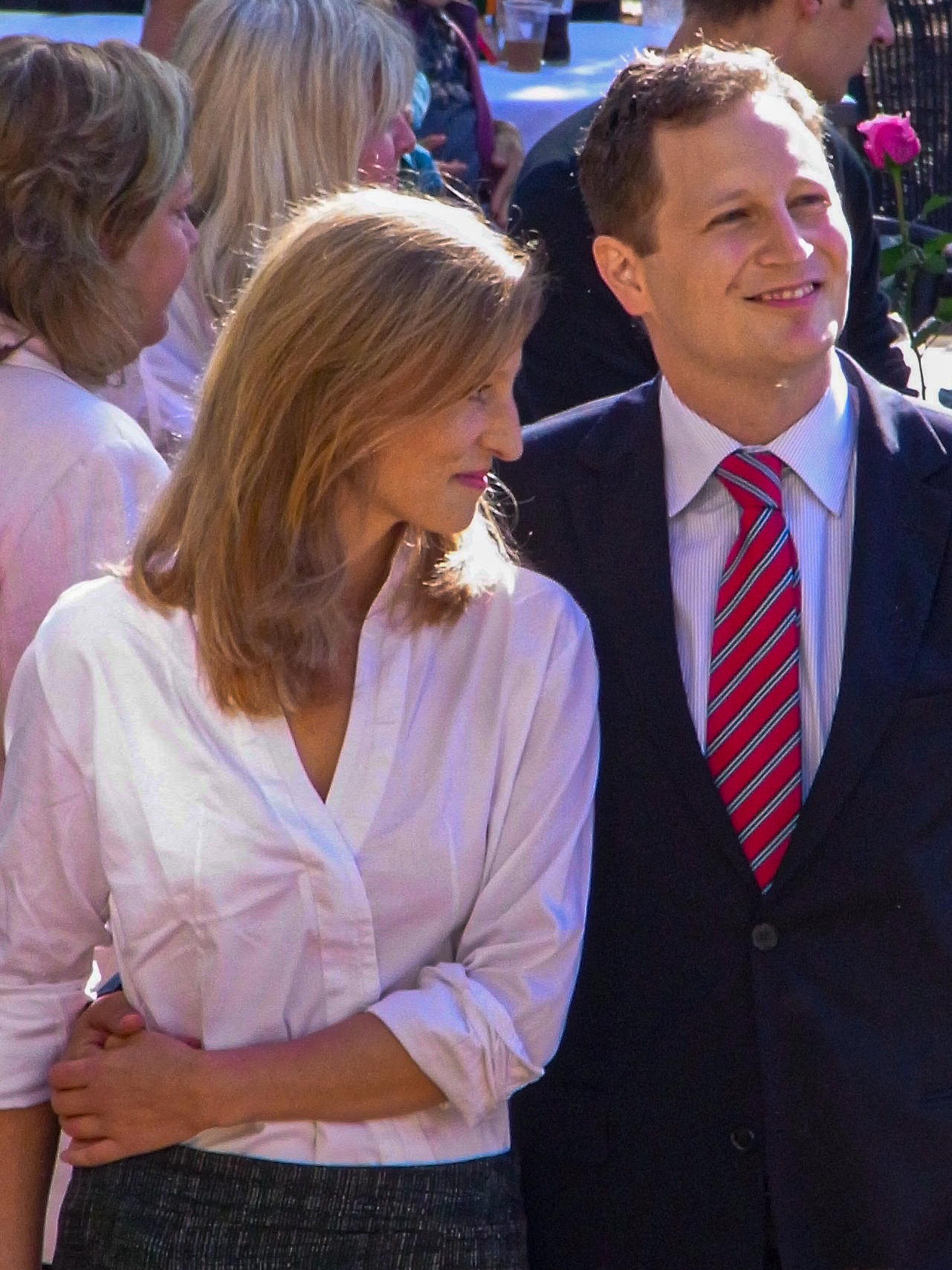
Georg Friedrich and his wife in 2011

In 2011, Georg Friedrich married Princess Sophie of Isenburg. The civil wedding took place in Potsdam on 25 August 2011, and the ecumenical religious wedding took place at the Church of Peace in Potsdam on 27 August 2011, in commemoration of the 950th anniversary of the founding of the House of Hohenzollern. The religious wedding was also broadcast live by local public television.

On 20 January 2013 Sophie gave birth to twin sons in Bremen, Carl Friedrich Franz Alexander and Louis Ferdinand Christian Albrecht. Carl Friedrich, the elder of the two, is his father's heir apparent. Their third child, Emma Marie Charlotte Sophie, was born on 2 April 2015. On 17 November 2016, Sophie gave birth to Heinrich Albert Johann Georg, their fourth child.

== Property claims ==
In 2014, Georg Friedrich filed a claim on the property of the Huis Doorn in the Netherlands, where Kaiser Wilhelm II spent his last years after abdication, but this was rejected by Dutch Minister of Education, Culture and Science Jet Bussemaker.

In mid-2019, it was revealed that, since 2014, Georg Friedrich had filed claims for permanent right of residency for his family in Cecilienhof, or one of two other former Hohenzollern palaces in Potsdam, as well as return of the family library, 266 paintings, an imperial crown and sceptre, and the letters of Empress Augusta Victoria. This sparked a public debate about the legitimacy of these claims and the role of the Hohenzollern during and before the Nazi regime in Germany, specifically Crown Prince Wilhelm's involvement. On 9 March 2023, Georg Friedrich dropped the suit, hoping that doing so would "open the way for an unencumbered historical debate on the role of my family in the 20th Century following the end of the monarchy."

In June 2019, a claim made by Georg Friedrich that Rheinfels Castle be returned to the Hohenzollern family was dismissed by a court. In 1924, the ruined castle had been given to the town of St Goar, under the proviso (the conditional provision to an agreement) it was not sold. In 1998, the town leased the ruins to a nearby hotel. His case made the claim that this constituted a breach of the bequest.

== Honours ==
=== Foreign ===
- (Sweden) Amaranther Order Honorary Knight Grand Cross, Special Class of the Order of Amaranth

Georg Friedrich Prinz von Preussen House of Hohenzollern Born: 10 June 1976
Titles in pretence
| Preceded by Louis Ferdinand | — TITULAR — Prince of Prussia; 26 September 1994 – present Reason for succession failure: Kingdom of Prussia abolished in 1918 | Incumbent; Hereditary Prince: Carl Friedrich |
