= List of royal weddings =

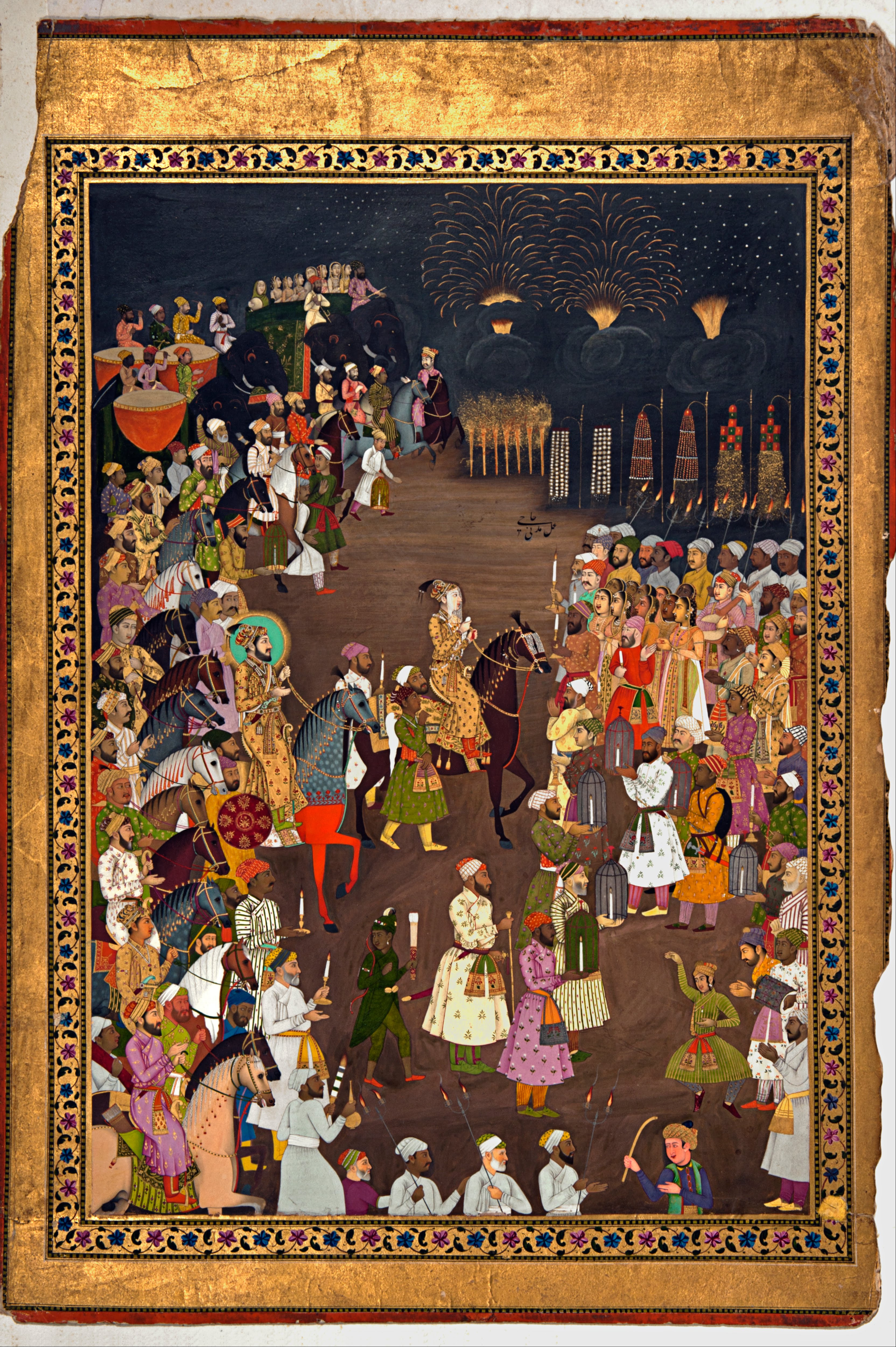
The Mughal Emperor Shah Jahan attends the marriage procession of his eldest son Dara Shikoh. Mughal-era fireworks were utilized to brighten the night throughout the wedding ceremony

A royal wedding is a marriage ceremony involving members of a royal family. Weddings involving senior members of the royal family are often seen as important occasions of state and attract significant national and international attention. The following is a list of notable royal weddings:

== 16th century ==
=== England and Spain ===
- 25 July 1554: Mary I, Queen of England, elder daughter of King Henry VIII and successor of King Edward VI, was married to Philip, Prince of Asturias, eldest son and future successor of Charles I, King of Spain, at Winchester Cathedral, Winchester.

=== France and Scotland ===
- 24 April 1558: Mary, Queen of Scots, only daughter and successor of King James V, was married to Francis, Dauphin of France, eldest son and future successor of Henry II of France, at Notre-Dame de Paris, Paris.

=== Scotland ===
- 29 July 1565: Mary, Queen of Scots, only daughter and successor of James V, was married to Henry Stuart, Lord Darnley at the Palace of Holyroodhouse, Edinburgh.

== 17th century ==
=== Great Britain and the Electoral Palatinate ===
- 14 February 1613: Elizabeth Stuart, only surviving daughter of James VI and I, King of England, Scotland and Ireland, was married to Frederick V, Elector Palatine, at the Palace of Whitehall, London.

=== Sweden and Prussia ===
- 25 November 1620: Gustaf II Adolf, King of Sweden, eldest surviving son and successor of King Charles IX, was married to Maria Eleonora of Brandenburg, second daughter of John Sigismund, Elector of Brandenburg, at the Royal Castle, Stockholm.

== 18th century ==
=== Portugal and Spain ===
- 19 January 1729: In two simultaneous ceremonies, Joseph, Prince of Brazil, eldest son and future successor of John V, King of Portugal, was married to Infanta Mariana Victoria of Spain, while Mariana's half-brother Ferdinand, Prince of Asturias, eldest surviving son and future successor of Philip V, King of Spain, was married to Joseph's sister Infanta Barbara of Portugal.

=== Sweden and Denmark ===
- 4 November 1766: Gustav, Crown Prince of Sweden, eldest son and future successor of King Adolf Frederick, was married to Princess Sophia Magdalena of Denmark, daughter of Frederick V, King of Denmark, at the Royal Chapel, Stockholm Palace, Stockholm.

== 19th century ==
=== Empire of Brazil ===
- 15 October 1864: Isabel, Princess Imperial of Brazil, elder daughter and heir of Emperor Pedro II, was married to Gaston, Count of Eu, grandson of Louis Philippe I, King of the French, at the Old Cathedral of Rio de Janeiro, Rio de Janeiro.

=== Russian Empire ===
- 26 November 1894: Nicholas II, the last Emperor of Russia, eldest son and successor of Emperor Alexander III, was married to Princess Alix of Hesse and by Rhine, fourth daughter of Louis IV, Grand Duke of Hesse, at the Grand Church of the Winter Palace, Saint Petersburg.

=== United Kingdom ===
- 10 February 1840: Queen Victoria of the United Kingdom, only daughter of Prince Edward, Duke of Kent and Strathearn, granddaughter of King George III, and successor of King William IV, was married to Prince Albert of Saxe-Coburg and Gotha, younger son of Ernest I of Saxe-Coburg and Gotha, at the Chapel Royal, St James's Palace, London.
- 10 March 1863: Albert Edward, Prince of Wales, eldest son and future successor of Queen Victoria, was married to Princess Alexandra of Denmark, eldest daughter of the future Christian IX, King of Denmark, at St George's Chapel, Windsor Castle, Windsor.
- 6 July 1893: Prince George, Duke of York, grandson of Queen Victoria, second son and successor of the future King Edward VII, was married to Princess Victoria Mary of Teck at the Chapel Royal, St James's Palace, London.

== 20th century ==
=== Belgium ===
- 15 December 1960: Baudouin, King of the Belgians, eldest son and successor of King Leopold III, was married to Doña Fabiola de Mora y Aragón at the Cathedral of St. Michael and St. Gudula, Brussels.
- 4 December 1999: Prince Philippe, Duke of Brabant, eldest child and future successor of King Albert II, was married to Jonkvrouw Mathilde d'Udekem d'Acoz at the Cathedral of St. Michael and St. Gudula, Brussels.

=== Denmark ===
- 24 May 1935: Frederik, Crown Prince of Denmark, elder son and future successor of King Christian X, was married to Princess Ingrid of Sweden, only daughter of the future Gustaf VI Adolf, King of Sweden, at Stockholm Cathedral, Stockholm.
- 10 June 1967: Princess Margrethe of Denmark, eldest daughter and future successor of King Frederik IX, was married to Henri de Laborde de Monpezat at Holmen Church, Copenhagen.

=== Greece ===
- 14 May 1962: Sophia of Greece and Denmark, eldest child of Paul, King of the Hellenes, was married to Juan Carlos, Prince of Spain, the future king of Spain, at the Cathedral Basilica of St. Dionysius the Areopagite, Athens.
- 18 September 1964: Constantine II, King of the Hellenes, only son and successor of King Paul, was married to Anne-Marie of Denmark, youngest daughter of Frederik IX, King of Denmark, at the Metropolitan Cathedral of Athens, Athens.
- 1 July 1995: Pavlos, Crown Prince of Greece, eldest son and second child of former King Constantine II, was married to Marie-Chantal Miller at Saint Sophia Cathedral, London.

=== Monaco ===
- 19 April 1956: Rainier III, Prince of Monaco, only grandson and successor of Prince Louis II, was married to Grace Kelly at the Cathedral of Our Lady Immaculate, Monaco.

=== Nepal ===
- 27 February 1970: Birendra, Crown Prince of Nepal, eldest son and future successor of King Mahendra, was married to Aishwarya Rajya Lakshmi Devi Rana.

=== The Netherlands ===
- 10 March 1966: Princess Beatrix of the Netherlands, eldest child and future successor of Queen Juliana, was married to Claus van Amsberg at the Prinsenhof and the Westerkerk, Amsterdam.

=== Norway ===
- 29 August 1968: Harald, Crown Prince of Norway, eldest son and future successor of King Olav V, was married to Sonja Haraldsen at Oslo Cathedral, Oslo.

=== Spain ===
- 31 May 1906: Alfonso XIII, King of Spain, only son and successor of King Alfonso XII, was married to Princess Victoria Eugenie of Battenberg at the Church of Saint Jerome the Royal, Madrid.
- 18 March 1995: Infanta Elena, elder daughter of King Juan Carlos I and Queen Sofía, was married to Jaime de Marichalar at Seville Cathedral, Seville.

=== Sweden ===
- 15 June 1905: Prince Gustaf Adolf, Duke of Skåne, eldest son and successor of the future King Gustaf V, was married to Princess Margaret of Connaught, granddaughter of Victoria, Queen of the United Kingdom, at St George's Chapel, Windsor Castle, Windsor, England
- 19 June 1976: Carl XVI Gustaf, King of Sweden, grandson and successor of King Gustaf VI Adolf, was married to Silvia Sommerlath at the Storkyrkan, Stockholm.

=== United Kingdom ===
- 27 February 1919: Princess Patricia of Connaught was married to Commodore The Hon. Alexander Ramsay at Westminster Abbey, London.
- 28 February 1922: Princess Mary, only daughter of King George V, was married to Henry Lascelles, Viscount Lascelles at Westminster Abbey, London.
- 26 April 1923: Prince Albert, Duke of York, second son of King George V and successor of the future King Edward VIII, was married to Lady Elizabeth Bowes-Lyon at Westminster Abbey, London.
- 29 November 1934: Prince George, Duke of Kent, fourth son of King George V, was married to Princess Marina of Greece and Denmark, granddaughter of George I, King of the Hellenes, at Westminster Abbey, London.
- 6 November 1935: Prince Henry, Duke of Gloucester, third son of King George V, was married to Lady Alice Montagu Douglas Scott at the private chapel of Buckingham Palace, London.
- 3 June 1937: Prince Edward, Duke of Windsor, former King and eldest son and successor of King George V, was married to Wallis Simpson at Château de Candé, Monts, Indre-et-Loire.
- 20 November 1947: Princess Elizabeth, elder daughter and future successor of King George VI, was married to Lieutenant Philip Mountbatten, grandson of George I, King of the Hellenes, at Westminster Abbey, London.
- 6 May 1960: Princess Margaret, younger daughter of King George VI, was married to Antony Armstrong-Jones at Westminster Abbey, London.
- 8 June 1961: Prince Edward, Duke of Kent, third grandson of King George V and elder son of Prince George, Duke of Kent, was married to Katharine Worsley at York Minster, York.
- 24 April 1963: Princess Alexandra of Kent, third granddaughter of King George V and only daughter of Prince George, Duke of Kent, was married to The Hon. Angus Ogilvy at Westminster Abbey, London.
- 14 November 1973: Princess Anne, only daughter of Queen Elizabeth II, was married to Captain Mark Phillips at Westminster Abbey, London.
- 29 July 1981: Charles, Prince of Wales, eldest son and successor of Queen Elizabeth II, was married to Lady Diana Spencer at St Paul's Cathedral, London.
- 23 July 1986: Prince Andrew, Duke of York, second son of Queen Elizabeth II, was married to Sarah Ferguson at Westminster Abbey, London.
- 19 June 1999: Prince Edward, Earl of Wessex, third son and youngest child of Queen Elizabeth II, was married to Sophie Rhys-Jones at St George's Chapel, Windsor Castle, Windsor.

== 21st century ==
=== Bhutan ===
- 13 October 2011: Jigme Khesar Namgyel Wangchuck, King of Bhutan, eldest son and successor of King Jigme Singye Wangchuck, was married to Jetsun Pema at the Punakha Dzong, Punakha.

=== Denmark ===
- 14 May 2004: Frederik, Crown Prince of Denmark, elder son and future successor of Queen Margrethe II, was married to Mary Donaldson at the Church of Our Lady, Copenhagen.

=== Jordan ===
- 1 June 2023: Hussein, Crown Prince of Jordan, elder son of King Abdullah II and heir apparent, was married to Rajwa Al Saif at the Zahran Palace, Amman.

=== Luxembourg ===
- 20 October 2012: Guillaume, Hereditary Grand Duke of Luxembourg, eldest child and future successor of Grand Duke Henri, was married to Countess Stéphanie de Lannoy at Notre-Dame Cathedral, Luxembourg.

=== Monaco ===
- 1 July 2011: Albert II, Prince of Monaco, only son and successor of Prince Rainier III, was married to Charlene Wittstock at the Prince's Palace of Monaco, Monaco.

=== The Netherlands ===
- 2 February 2002: Willem-Alexander, Prince of Orange, eldest son and future successor of Queen Beatrix, was married to Máxima Zorreguieta Cerruti at Nieuwe Kerk, Amsterdam.

=== Norway ===
- 25 August 2001: Haakon, Crown Prince of Norway, only son and future successor of King Harald V, was married to Mette-Marit Tjessem Høiby at Oslo Cathedral, Oslo.

=== Russia ===
- 1 October 2021: Grand Duke George Mikhailovich of Russia, only child of Grand Duchess Maria Vladimirovna of Russia, claimant to the headship of the House of Romanov, was married to Rebecca Virginia Bettarini at Saint Isaac's Cathedral, Saint Petersburg.

=== Spain ===
- 22 May 2004: Felipe, Prince of Asturias, only son and future successor of King Juan Carlos I, was married to Letizia Ortiz Rocasolano at Almudena Cathedral, Royal Palace of Madrid, Madrid.

=== Sweden ===
- 19 June 2010: Victoria, Crown Princess of Sweden, eldest child and heir apparent of King Carl XVI Gustaf, was married to Daniel Westling at the Storkyrkan, Stockholm.
- 8 June 2013: Princess Madeleine, Duchess of Hälsingland and Gästrikland, youngest child of King Carl XVI Gustaf, was married to Christopher O'Neill at the Royal Chapel, Stockholm Palace, Stockholm.
- 13 June 2015: Prince Carl Philip, Duke of Värmland, only son of King Carl XVI Gustaf, was married to Sofia Hellqvist at the Royal Chapel, Stockholm Palace, Stockholm.

=== Tonga ===
- 12 July 2012: Tupoutoʻa ʻUlukalala, Crown Prince of Tonga, elder son of King Tupou VI and heir apparent, was married to Sinaitakala Tu'imatamoana 'i Fanakavakilangi Fakafānua at the Centennial Church, Nukuʻalofa.

=== United Kingdom ===
- 9 April 2005: Charles, Prince of Wales, eldest son and future successor of Queen Elizabeth II, was married to Camilla Parker Bowles at the Windsor Guildhall, Windsor.
- 29 April 2011: Prince William, Duke of Cambridge, second grandson of Queen Elizabeth II, elder son of the future King Charles III and heir apparent, was married to Catherine Middleton at Westminster Abbey, London.
- 19 May 2018: Prince Harry, Duke of Sussex, third grandson of Queen Elizabeth II and younger son of the future King Charles III, was married to Meghan Markle at St George's Chapel, Windsor Castle, Windsor.
- 12 October 2018: Princess Eugenie of York, third granddaughter of Queen Elizabeth II and younger daughter of Prince Andrew, Duke of York, was married to Jack Brooksbank at St George's Chapel, Windsor Castle, Windsor.
- 17 July 2020: Princess Beatrice of York, second granddaughter of Queen Elizabeth II and elder daughter of Prince Andrew, Duke of York, was married to Edoardo Mapelli Mozzi at the Royal Chapel of All Saints, Royal Lodge, Windsor.

== See also ==
- List of royal proxy marriages
