= List of royal proxy marriages =

This is a list of members of royal families who entered into a proxy marriage throughout history.

== Pre 11th century ==
- Clovis I King of the Franks to Clotilde, in 496. This is one of the first known proxy marriages in Western history.

== 11th century ==
- Alfonso VI of Galacia and León to Adeliza (daughter of William the Conqueror and Matilda of Flanders), before 1074. She died before the marriage was consummated.

== 12th century ==
- Alfonso VIII of Castile to Eleanor of England, in 1170

== 13th century ==
- Frederick II, Holy Roman Emperor to Isabella II of Jerusalem, in August 1225
- Henry I of Cyprus to Alice of Montferrat, in 1229
- Henry III of England to Eleanor of Provence, in November 1235. He had already been contracted to marry by proxy to Yolanda of Brittany, but this arrangement was annulled. He had also been married by proxy to Joan, Countess of Ponthieu earlier in 1235, but that marriage was abandoned as it was politically unacceptable to the French and was later annulled. The annulment was granted as the marriage had not been consummated and Henry and Joan were related within the forbidden degrees. Yolande of Brittany instead married Hugh XI of Lusignan in January 1236. Joan of Ponthieu instead married Ferdinand III of Castile in October 1237.
- Richard of Cornwall (the second son of John, King of England, and Isabella, Countess of Angoulême) to Sanchia of Provence, in July 1242. Sanchia was already married by proxy to Raymond VII, Count of Toulouse, but he had failed to obtain an annulment of his first marriage to Sancha of Aragon so the arrangement was declared void. Richard and Sanchia were later crowned as king and queen of Germany, by the Archbishop of Cologne, on 17 May 1257.
- Manfred, King of Sicily to Beatrice of Savoy, Marchioness of Saluzzo, in March 1247
- Llewelyn ap Gruffudd, Prince of Wales to Eleanor de Montfort, in 1275
- Giovanni Malatesta to Francesca da Rimini in 1275
- Alfonso III of Aragorn to Eleanor of England, on 15 August 1290. Alfonso died in 1291 before the couple met, so the marriage was not consummated. She went on to marry Henry III, Count of Bar on 20 September 1293.
- Philip II, Latin Emperor to Thamar Angelina Komnene, in 1294. The marriage ended in divorce in 1309 and Tharmar died in 1311. He remarried to Catherine of Valois in 1313.

== 14th century ==
- Robert the Wise, King of Naples to Sancia of Majorca, on 17 June 1304
- Sancho of Majorca to Maria of Naples, on 20 September 1304
- Edward II of England to Isabella of France, in 1305
- James II of Aragon to Marie of Lusignan, on 15 June 1315
- Edward III of England to Philippa of Hainault, in October 1327
- Guy of Lusignan to Marie de Bourbon, Princess of Achaea, on 30 December 1328
- Peter of Castile to Joan of England, in 1348, however she died of the Black Death while travelling in Bordeaux on her way to Castile and León
- James IV of Majorca to Joanna I of Naples, on 14 December 1362
- Haakon VI of Norway to Margaret I of Denmark, on 9 April 1363
- Peter II of Cyprus to Valentina Visconti, in 1377
- John I of Aragon to Violant of Bar, on 9 October 1379
- James of Baux to Agnes of Durazzo, on 16 September 1382
- Louis I, Duke of Orléans to Mary, Queen of Hungary, in April 1385. Four months after the proxy marriage, Sigismund of Luxembourg married Mary, ignoring her previous proxy wedding. Charles III of Naples then invaded Hungary, Sigismund fled, and Mary was forced to abdicate. Charles was not king for long, as he was stabbed on 7 February 1386 and died of his wounds on 24 February 1386. Mary was restored as Queen of Hungary and she and her husband Sigismund were officially co-rulers until the end of her life in 1395 after a horse riding accident. Sigismund remained as King of Hungary and Charles' son Ladislaus of Naples would later try to regain the Hungarian throne and proclaimed himself Duke of Slavonia, a title with no basis.
- John I of Portugal to Philippa of Lancaster, on 14 February 1387
- Amadeus VIII, Duke of Savoy to Mary of Burgundy, on 30 October 1393
- Richard II of England to Isabella of Valois, on 9 March 1396

== 15th century ==
- Henry IV of England to Joanna of Navarre, on 2 April 1402
- Martin I of Sicily to Blanche I of Navarre, in May 1402
- Thomas Fitzalan, Earl of Arundel to Beatrice of Portugal (illegitimate daughter of John I of Portugal), in April 1405
- Erik of Pomerania to Philippa of England, on 26 November 1405
- Janus, King of Cyprus to Charlotte of Bourbon, on 2 August 1409
- Filippo Maria Visconti to Marie of Savoy, Duchess of Milan, on 2 December 1427
- Philip the Good, Duke of Burgundy to Isabella of Portugal, in 1429
- John II of Cyprus to Amadea Palaiologina of Montferrat, in 1437
- Francesco I Sforza to Bianca Maria Visconti on 25 October 1441
- Henry VI of England to Margaret of Anjou, on 24 May 1444
- John de la Pole to Margaret Beaufort, in 1450. The marriage was annulled in 1453. John went on to marry Elizabeth of York, Duchess of Suffolk (sister of the Yorkist kings Edward IV and Richard III). Margaret went on to marry three times: firstly to Edmund Tudor, Earl of Richmond, secondly to Sir Henry Stafford and thirdly to Thomas Stanley, 1st Earl of Derby.
- Sforza Maria Sforza, Duke of Bari to Eleanor of Naples, in 1465. The marriage was not consummated, a divorce was negotiated by the brides father and a new marriage arranged for her to Ercole I d'Este.
- Alfonso II of Naples to Ippolita Maria Sforza, in 1465
- Galeazzo Maria Sforza, Duke of Milan to Bona of Savoy, on 9 May 1468
- James II of Cyprus to Catherine Cornaro, on 30 July 1468
- Lorenzo de' Medici, de facto ruler of the Florentine Republic, to Clarice Orsini, on 7 February 1469
- Charles of Valois, Duke of Berry to Joanna la Beltraneja, on 26 October 1470
- Ivan III of Russia to Sophia Palaiologina of Byzantium, on 1 June 1472, Ivan Fryazin stood as proxy for the Grand Prince of Moscow and all Russia
- Fernando II, Duke of Braganza to Isabel of Viseu, in 1472
- James IV of Scotland to Cecily of York, on 26 December 1474. The marriage was not proceeded with after the death of Cecily's father King Edward IV, the usurpation of the English throne by her uncle King Richard III and Cecily and her siblings being declared illegitimate. Her uncle married her to Ralph Scrope, the younger brother of the 6th Baron Scrope of Masham. After the accession of King Henry VII, her marriage was dissolved and she married the half-brother of the King's mother Margaret Beaufort, John Welles, 1st Viscount Welles.
- Vladislaus II of Hungary to Barbara of Brandenburg, in 1475
- Matthias Corvinus to Beatrice of Naples, on 15 September 1476
- Maximilian I, Holy Roman Emperor to Mary, Duchess of Burgundy, in 1477
- Piero the Unfortunate to Alfonsina Orsini, in 1486
- John Corvinus (illegitimate son of King Matthias Corvinus of Hungary) to Bianca Maria Sforza, widow of Philibert I, Duke of Savoy, on 25 November 1487. The formal marriage never took place.
- Maximilian I, Holy Roman Emperor to Anne of Brittany, on 19 December 1490. Wolfgang von Polheim was proxy for Maximilian and as part of the symbolism of the proxy wedding on the wedding night Polheim went to bed with Anne but wore a full suit of armour apart from on his right leg and hand. A sword was also placed between them in the bed. The unconsummated marriage was declared null and void due to diplomatic and military pressure. Maximilian later married Bianca Maria Sforza, and Anne married Charles VIII of France in December 1491, who was already betrothed himself to the 3-year-old Margaret of Austria. After Charles VIII died in a riding accident on 4 April 1498, Anne married his successor as King of France, Louis XII, on 6 December 1491 after Pope Alexander VI annulled his childless marriage to Joan of France, Duchess of Berry on 15 February 1492 with the retroactive date of 5 December 1491. Louise XII hoped to annex permanently the Duchy of Brittany to the French Crown by his marriage to Anne.
- Afonso, Prince of Portugal to Isabella of Aragon, in 1490
- Giovanni Sforza to Lucrezia Borgia, on 12 June 1493. The marriage was annulled due to claims of his impotence and on the grounds of non-consummation in March 1497. Lucrezia later married secondly to Alfonso of Aragon, Duke of Bisceglie and Prince of Salerno then thirdly to Alfonso I d'Este, Duke of Ferrara. Giovanni later married to Ginevra Tiepolo, who gave him two sons.
- Maximilian I, Holy Roman Emperor to Bianca Maria Sforza, in 1493
- Gioffre Borgia to Sancha of Aragon (natural daughter of Alfonso II of Naples), in 1494
- Philip the Handsome to Joanne of Castille, on 4 November 1495
- John, Prince of Asturias to Margaret of Austria, in 1495. The marriage was celebrated in person on 5 October 1497, but Prince John died five months later
- Prince Arthur Tudor to Catherine of Aragon, on 19 May 1499

== 16th century ==
- Manuel I of Portugal to Maria of Aragon, in 1500
- Philibert II, Duke of Savoy to Archduchess Margaret of Austria, on 26 July 1501
- James IV of Scotland to Margaret Tudor, on 25 January 1502
- Ferdinand II of Aragon to Germaine of Foix, in 1505
- Charles V, Holy Roman Emperor to Mary Tudor, in December 1508. Before she travelled to Spain, agreements shifted in Europe, the marriage was called off and Mary's brother Henry VIII made an alliance with the French king Louis XII. Mary was instead married to the French king in 1514.
- Louis XII of France to Mary Tudor, on 13 August 1514
- Christian II of Denmark to Isabella of Austria, in 1514, with her grandfather Emperor Maximilian I standing in for the king. The king of Denmark had first intended to marry Isabella's eldest sister Eleanor of Austria, who went on to become Queen of Portugal (1518–1521) then Queen of France (1530–1547).
- Ferdinand I, Holy Roman Emperor to Anne of Bohemia and Hungary, in 1515
- Sigismund the Old, King of Poland and Grand Duke of Lithuania, to Bona Sforza, on 6 December 1517
- Manuel I of Portugal to Eleanor of Austria, on 10 July 1518
- Stephen VII Báthory to Sophia of Masovia, on 17 September 1520
- Charles III, Duke of Savoy to Beatrice of Portugal, on 4 August 1521
- Francis I of France to Eleanor of Austria, in 1526. The proxy wedding was conducted during Francis' captivity in Spain and the match formed part of the Treaty of Cambrai, also called the "Ladies' Peace." It helped end war between France and Spain, which was ruled by Charles V, Holy Roman Emperor, who was Eleanor's brother. The marriage was formalised in person in 1530
- Maharana Ratan Singh II of Mewar Kingdom to a daughter of Raja Prithviraj Singh I of Amber, in 1530. Singh's sword had been married as a proxy representing him, but the wedding was kept a secret. Hada prince Surajmal of Bundi was unaware and obtained her as his wife, causing unintended offence
- Sigismund II Augustus, King of Poland to Catherine of Austria, on 23 June 1533
- Francis II, Duke of Milan to Christina of Denmark, on 23 September 1533
- Henry II of France to Catherine de' Medici, in 1533
- Frederick II of the Palatinate to Dorothea of Denmark, on 18 May 1535
- James V of Scotland to Mary of Guise, on 9 May 1538. Robert Maxwell, 5th Lord Maxwell stood as proxy for the Scottish king.
- Cosimo I de' Medici to Eleanor of Toledo, on 29 March 1539
- John Manuel of Portugal to Joanna of Austria, on 11 January 1552
- Philip II of Spain to Élisabeth of Valois, on 15 June 1559
- Charles IX of France to Archduchess Elisabeth of Austria, on 22 October 1569
- Philip II of Spain to Anna of Austria, in May 1570
- Henry III of France to Louise of Lorraine, on 14 February 1576
- Ferdinando I de' Medici to Christina of Lorraine, on 25 February 1589
- James VI of Scotland and I of England to Anne of Denmark, on 20 August 1589, the ceremony ending with a torchlit procession and James's representative, George Keith, 5th Earl Marischal, sitting next to Anne on the bridal bed
- Virginio Orsini, Duke of Bracciano to Flavia Peretti, on 20 March 1589
- Sigismund III Vasa of Poland to Maria Anna of Bavaria, on 4 May 1592

== 17th century ==
- Henry IV of France to Marie de' Medici, on 5 October 1600
- False Dmitry I to Marina Mniszech, on 22 November 1605
- Louis XIII of France to Anne of Austria, on 18 October 1615
- Philip IV of Spain and Portugal to Elisabeth of France, on 18 October 1615
- Ferdinand II, Holy Roman Emperor to Eleonora Gonzaga the Elder, on 21 November 1621
- Charles I of England to Henrietta Maria of France, on 1 May 1625
- Gabriel Bethlen, Prince of Transylvania, to Catherine of Brandenburg, on 2 March 1626
- Ferdinand III, Holy Roman Emperor to Maria Anna of Spain, on 25 April 1629
- Gabriel Bethlen, Prince of Transylvania and King-elect of Hungary to Catherine of Brandenburg, in 1626
- Philip IV of Spain to Mariana of Austria, in 1647. The marriage was confirmed when she was 14 years old, on 7 October 1649
- Ferdinand Maria, Elector of Bavaria to Henriette Adelaide of Savoy in 1650
- Alfonso IV d'Este to Laura Martinozzi, Duchess of Modena and Reggio, on 27 May 1655
- Mirza Muhammad Sultan to Padishah Bibi, on 13 April 1656
- Louis XIV of France to Maria Theresa of Spain, on 2 June 1660
- Lorenzo Onofrio Colonna, 8th Prince of Paliano to Marie Mancini, on 11 April 1661
- Cosimo III de' Medici to Marguerite Louise d'Orléans, on 17 April 1661
- Charles V, Duke of Lorraine to Marie Jeanne Baptiste of Savoy-Nemours, in 1662. Lorraine soon refused to recognise the union, it had not been consummated and was annulled
- Afonso VI of Portugal to Maria Francisca of Savoy, on 27 June 1666
- Philippe I, Duke of Orléans to Elizabeth Charlotte of the Palatinate, on 16 November 1671
- James II of England to Mary of Modena on 30 September 1673
- Leopold I, Holy Roman Emperor to Claudia Felicitas of Austria, on 5 October 1673
- Charles II of Spain to Marie Louise d'Orléans, on 30 August 1679
- Louis, Grand Dauphin of France to Maria Anna Victoria of Bavaria, on 28 January 1680
- Victor Amadeus II to Anne Marie d'Orléans, in 1684
- Emmanuel Philibert, Prince of Carignano to Maria Angela Caterina d'Este, in 1684
- Charles II of Spain to Maria Anna of Neuburg, in August 1689
- Johann Wilhelm, Elector Palatine to Anna Maria Luisa de' Medici, on 29 April 1691
- Louis, Duke of Burgundy to Marie Adélaïde of Savoy, in 1696
- Leopold, Duke of Lorraine to Élisabeth Charlotte d'Orléans in 1698

== 18th century ==
- Philip V of Spain to Maria Luisa Gabriella of Savoy, on 12 September 1701
- Frederick William I of Prussia to Sophia Dorothea of Hanover, on 14 November 1706
- Charles VI, Holy Roman Emperor to Elisabeth Christine of Brunswick-Wolfenbüttel, in 1708
- Philip V of Spain to Elisabeth Farnese, on 16 September 1714
- James Francis Edward Stuart to Maria Clementina Sobieska, on 19 May 1719
- Francesco III, Duke of Modena to Charlotte Aglaé d'Orléans, on 11 February 1720
- Louis I of Spain to Louise Élisabeth d'Orléans, in November 1721
- Louis, Duke of Orléans to Auguste of Baden-Baden, on 13 July 1724
- Charles Emmanuel III, King of Sardinia, to Polyxena of Hesse-Rotenburg, on 23 July 1724
- Louis XV of France to Marie Leszczyńska, on 15 August 1725
- César Gabriel de Choiseul, Duke of Praslin to Anne Marie de Champagne, on 30 April 1732
- Prince Eugenio of Savoy, Count of Soissons to Maria Teresa Cybo-Malaspina, Duchess of Massa, in November 1734. He died on 23 November 1734, before the couple met and the marriage was annulled on the grounds that it was never consummated.
- Charles III of Spain to Maria Amalia of Saxony, on 9 May 1738
- Philip, Duke of Parma to Louise-Élisabeth of France, on 26 August 1739
- Frederick II, Landgrave of Hesse-Kassel to Princess Mary of Great Britain, on 8 May 1740
- Frederick V of Denmark to Louise of Great Britain, on 10 November 1743
- Adolf Frederick of Sweden to Louisa Ulrika of Prussia, on 17 July 1744
- Louis, Dauphin of France to María Teresa Rafaela of Spain, on 18 December 1744
- Louis, Dauphin of France to Maria Josepha of Saxony, on 10 January 1747
- Frederick Christian, Elector of Saxony to Duchess Maria Antonia of Bavaria on 13 June 1747
- Victor Amadeus III, Duke of Savoy to Maria Antonia Ferdinanda of Spain, on 10 April 1750
- Honoré III, Prince of Monaco to Maria Caterina Brignole, on 15 June 1757
- Louis François Joseph, Prince of Conti to Maria Fortunata d'Este, on 27 February 1759
- Archduke Joseph of Austria to Princess Isabella of Parma, on 7 September 1760
- George III of Great Britain to Charlotte of Mecklenburg-Strelitz, in 1761
- Leopold II, Holy Roman Emperor to Maria Luisa of Spain, on 16 February 1764
- Christian VII of Denmark to Caroline Matilda of Great Britain, on 1 October 1766
- Louis Alexandre, Prince of Lamballe to Marie Thérèse Louise of Savoy, in 1767
- Ferdinand IV & III of Naples and Sicily to Maria Carolina of Austria, on 7 April 1768
- Louis XVI of France to Marie Antoinette, on 19 April 1770
- Louis XVIII of France to Marie Joséphine of Savoy, on 1771
- Charles Edward Stuart, the Young Pretender to Louise of Stolberg-Gedern, on 28 March 1772
- Charles Emmanuel IV of Sardinia to Clotilde of France, on 21 August 1775
- Victor Emmanuel I of Sardinia to Maria Theresa of Austria-Este, on 29 June 1778
- Anthony, King of Saxony to Maria Carolina of Savoy, on 29 September 1781
- Infante Gabriel of Spain to Infanta Mariana Vitória of Braganza, on 12 April 1785
- John VI of Portugal to Carlota Joaquina of Spain, in 1785
- Anthony, King of Saxony to Maria Theresia of Austria, on 8 September 1787
- Maximilian Prince of Saxony to Princess Carolina of Parma, on 22 April 1792
- Gustav IV Adolf of Sweden to Frederica of Baden, on 6 October 1797

== 19th century ==
- Francis I of the Two Sicilies to María Isabella of Spain, on 6 July 1802
- Eugène de Beauharnais to Princess Augusta of Bavaria, in 1806
- Charles Felix of Sardinia to Maria Cristina of Naples and Sicily, on 7 March 1807
- Napoleon I of France to Joséphine de Beauharnais, in 1809
- Napoleon I of France to Marie Louise, Duchess of Parma, on 11 March 1810
- Maharaja Kharak Singh to Inder Kaur Bajwa, in 1815
- Charles Ferdinand, Duke of Berry to Marie-Caroline of Bourbon-Two Sicilies, Duchess of Berry, on 24 April 1816
- Francis I, Emperor of Austria to Caroline Augusta of Bavaria, on 28 October 1816
- Pedro I of Brazil to Maria Leopoldina of Austria, on 13 May 1817
- Infante Francisco de Paula of Spain to Princess Luisa Carlotta of Naples and Sicily, on 15 April 1819
- John, King of Saxony to Amalie Auguste of Bavaria, on 10 November 1822
- Oscar I of Sweden to Josephine of Leuchtenberg, on 22 May 1823
- Maximilian, Hereditary Prince of Saxony to Princess Maria Luisa Carlota of Parma, on 15 October 1825
- Pedro I of Brazil to Amélie of Leuchtenberg on 2 August 1829
- Ferdinand V of Hungary to Maria Anna of Savoy, on 12 February 1831
- Auguste, Duke of Leuchtenberg to Maria II of Portugal, on 1 December 1834
- Ferdinand II of Portugal to Maria II of Portugal, on 1 January 1836
- Carlos María Isidro of Spain to Maria Teresa of Braganza, in October 1837
- Pedro II of Brazil to Teresa Cristina of the Two Sicilies, on 30 May 1843
- Leopold II of Belgium to Marie Henriette of Austria, on 10 August 1853
- Pedro V of Portugal to Stephanie of Hohenzollen-Sigmaringen, on 29 April 1858
- Francis II of the Two Sicilies to Marie Sophie of Bavaria, on 8 January 1859
- Prince Napoléon-Jérôme Bonaparte to Princess Maria Clotilde of Savoy, in 1859
- Luís I of Portugal to Maria Pia of Savoy, on 27 September 1862
- Archduke Karl Ludwig of Austria to Maria Annunciata of Bourbon-Two Sicilies, on 16 October 1862
