= Princess Sinaitakala of Tonga =

Princess Sinaitakala of Tonga may refer to:

- Sinaitakala ʻOfeina ʻe he Langi (born 1953)
- Sinaitakala Fakafanua (born 1987)
