= Maria Theresa of Austria, Queen of Saxony =

Queen of Saxony in 1827

Maria Theresa of Austria
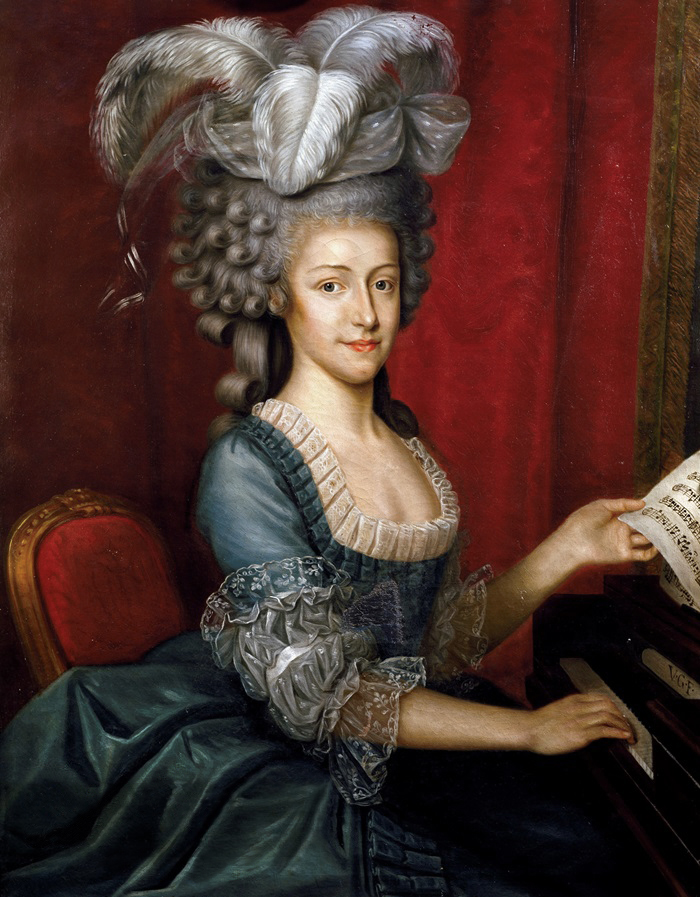
- Portrait of Maria Theresa by Vincenzo Giannini, c. 1785–87

Queen consort of Saxony
- Tenure: 5 May 1827 – 7 November 1827
- Born: 14 January 1767; Florence, Grand Duchy of Tuscany
- Died: 7 November 1827 (aged 60); Leipzig, Kingdom of Saxony
- Burial: Katholische Hofkirche
- Spouse: Anthony, King of Saxony (m. 1787)
Names
- Maria Theresia Josepha Charlotte Johanna
- House: Habsburg-Lorraine (by birth); Wettin (by marriage)
- Father: Leopold II, Holy Roman Emperor
- Mother: Maria Luisa of Spain

Maria Theresa of Austria (Maria Theresia Josepha Charlotte Johanna; 14 January 1767 – 7 November 1827) was born an Archduchess of Austria and a Princess of Tuscany. She was later Queen of Saxony as the second wife and consort of King Anthony of Saxony.

== Early life ==
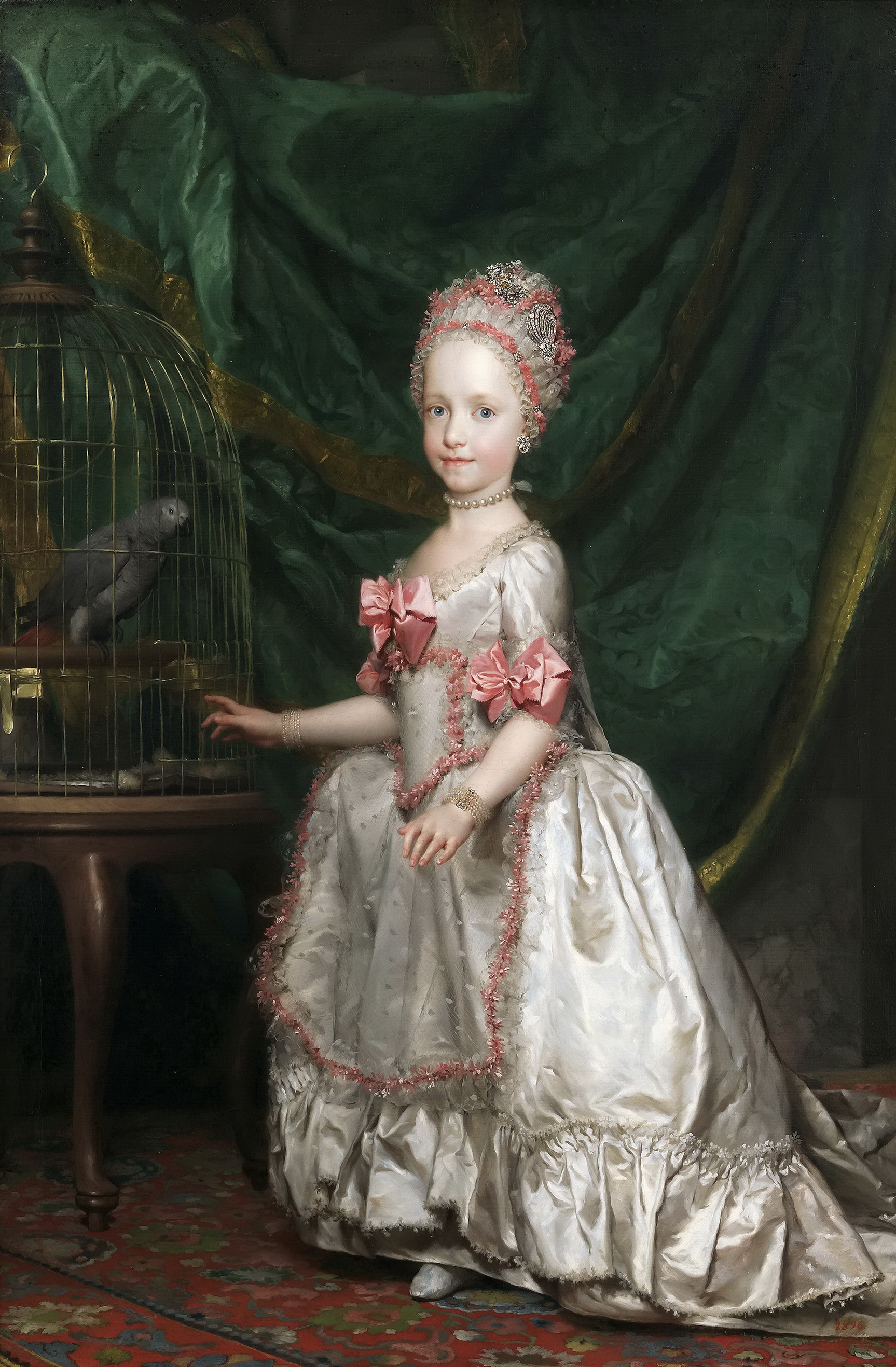
Maria Theresa in 1771, by Anton Raphael Mengs.

Maria Theresa was born in Florence, Grand Duchy of Tuscany, the eldest child of Grand Duke Peter Leopold of Tuscany (later Leopold II, Holy Roman Emperor) and his wife Maria Luisa of Spain. As such, she was also the eldest grandchild of Charles III of Spain. Like all the eldest daughters of the children of her paternal grandparents, she was named after her grandmother, the Habsburg ruler Maria Theresa.

Maria Theresa and her siblings were given a somewhat different upbringing than was usual for royal children at the time: they were actually raised by their parents rather than a retinue of servants, were largely kept apart from any ceremonial court life and were taught to live simply and modestly.

== Marriage ==
On 8 September 1787, Maria Theresa was married to Prince Anthony of Saxony by proxy in Florence; the couple later married in person in Dresden on 18 October 1787. Anthony had previously been married to Maria Carolina of Savoy, who died of smallpox in 1782. Mozart's opera Don Giovanni was originally intended to be performed in honor of Maria Theresa and Anthony Clement for their visit to Prague on 14 October 1787, as they traveled between Dresden and Vienna, and librettos were printed with dedication to them.

The premiere could not be arranged in time, however, so the opera The Marriage of Figaro was substituted on the express orders of Maria Theresa's uncle, Holy Roman Emperor Joseph II. The choice of The Marriage of Figaro was considered improper for a new bride by many observers, and the couple left the opera theater early without seeing the entire work performed. Mozart complained bitterly of the intrigues surrounding this incident in a letter to his friend Gottfried von Jacquin that was written in stages between 15 October and 25 October 1787. She was also present in Prague in September 1791 for the premiere of Mozart's opera La clemenza di Tito, which was written as part of the celebrations there in honor of the coronation of her father as King of Bohemia.

Maria Theresa was described as a simple and homely character devoted to a private family life, and she was reportedly relieved to marry a spouse who was, at the time of their marriage, not expected to succeed to a throne. Her four children all died as infants. However, at the death of her cousin and sister-in-law, Princess Carolina of Parma, she and her other sister-in-law, Amalie of Zweibrücken-Birkenfeld, shared the responsibility of raising the former's children, something they are said to have done very strictly.

== Later life ==
Maria Theresa assisted her father, by then Holy Roman Emperor, to arrange the meeting between Austria, Prussia and the French émigrées in Saxony, which resulted in the Declaration of Pillnitz 25 August 1791.

In 1806, she and her family fled Saxony for Prague during the war against Napoleon I. They were able to return in 1813. She was able to enjoy the title queen of Saxony for only a few months after the death of her brother-in-law Frederick Augustus I in May 1827. The latter's alliance with Napoleon led to significant losses of territory for Saxony at the Congress of Vienna.

Maria Theresa died at Leipzig in 1827.

== Issue ==
Maria Theresa and Anthony were parents to four children, all of whom were born and died in Dresden; none survived to the age of two:

1. Maria Ludovika Auguste Fredericka Therese Franziska Johanna Aloysia Nepomucena Ignatia Anna Josepha Xaveria Franziska de Paula Barbara (14 March 1795 – 25 April 1796).
2. Frederick Augustus (b. and d. 5 April 1796).
3. Maria Johanna Ludovica Anna Amalia Nepomucena Aloysia Ignatia Xaveria Josepha Franziska de Chantal Eva Apollonia Magdalena Crescentia Vincentia (5 April 1798 – 30 October 1799).
4. Maria Theresia (b. and d. 15 October 1799).

== Ancestry ==
Ancestors of Maria Theresa of Austria, Queen of Saxony

8. Leopold, Duke of Lorraine
4. Francis I, Holy Roman Emperor
9. Élisabeth Charlotte of Orléans
2. Leopold II, Holy Roman Emperor
10. Charles VI, Holy Roman Emperor
5. Maria Theresa of Austria
11. Elisabeth Christine of Brunswick
1. Maria Theresa of Austria
12. Philip V of Spain
6. Charles III of Spain
13. Elisabeth Farnese
3. Maria Luisa of Spain
14. Augustus III of Poland
7. Maria Amalia of Saxony
15. Maria Josepha of Austria

Maria Theresa of Austria, Queen of Saxony House of Habsburg-Lorraine Cadet branch of the House of Lorraine Born: 30 January 1757 Died: 7 November 1827
German royalty
Preceded by Amalie of Zweibrücken-Birkenfeld	Queen consort of Saxony; 5 May 1827 – 7 November 1827	Vacant Title next held by Maria Anna of Bavaria
