= Anthony, King of Saxony =

King of Saxony from 1827 to 1836

Anthony
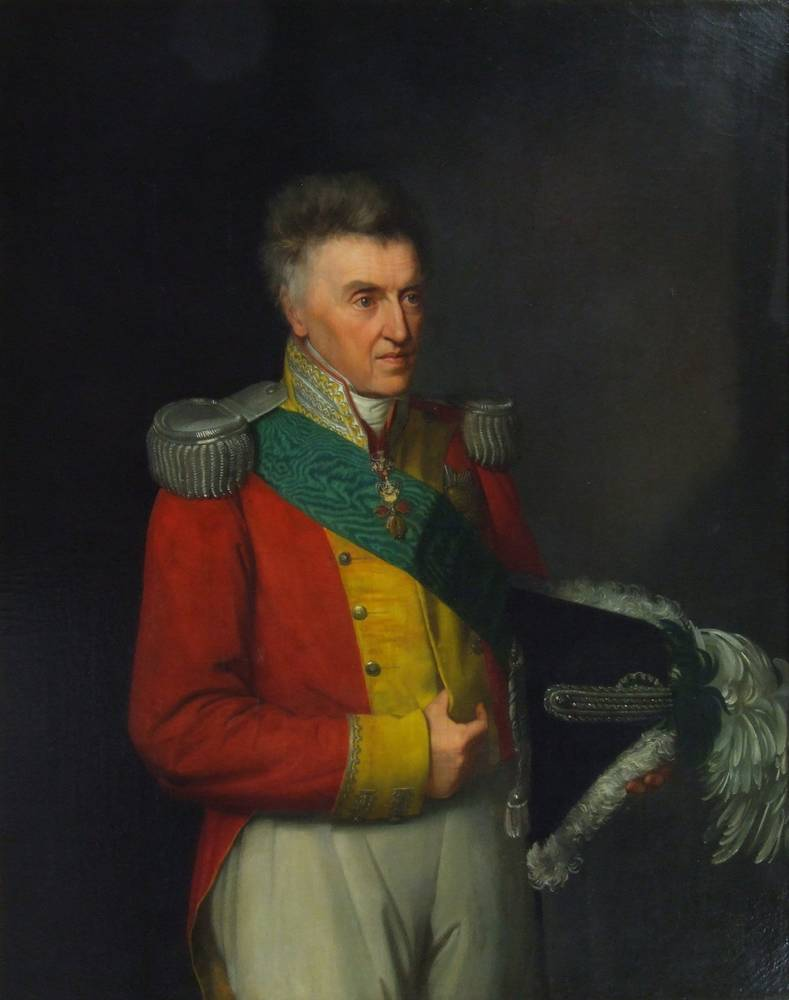
- Portrait by Carl Christian Vogel von Vogelstein (1827)

King of Saxony
- Reign: 5 May 1827 – 6 June 1836
- Predecessor: Frederick Augustus I
- Successor: Frederick Augustus II
- Born: 27 December 1755; Dresden, Electorate of Saxony, Holy Roman Empire
- Died: 6 June 1836 (aged 80); Dresden, Kingdom of Saxony, German Confederation
- Burial: Katholische Hofkirche
- Spouses: Maria Carolina of Savoy (m. 1781; died 1782) Maria Theresia of Austria (m. 1787; died 1827)
Names
- German: Anton Clemens Theodor Maria Joseph Johann Evangelista Nepomuk Franz Xaver Aloys Januar; English: Anthony Clement Theodore Mary Joseph John the Evangelist Nepomucene Francis Xavier Aloysius Januarius
- House: Wettin (Albertine line)
- Father: Frederick Christian, Elector of Saxony
- Mother: Duchess Maria Antonia of Bavaria

Anthony of Saxony (German: Anton; 27 December 1755 – 6 June 1836) was a King of Saxony from the House of Wettin. He became known as Anton der Gütige ("Anthony the Kind").

He was the fifth but third surviving son of Frederick Christian, Elector of Saxony and his wife Duchess Maria Antonia of Bavaria.

== Early life ==
With few chances to take part in the politics of the Electorate of Saxony or receive any land from his older brother Frederick Augustus III, Anton lived under the shadows. No Elector of Saxony after Johann Georg I gave appanages to his younger sons.

During the first years of the reign of his older brother as Elector, Anthony was the third in line, preceded only by his older brother Charles. The death of Charles (8 September 1781) made him the next in line to the Electorate as Electoral Prince (de: Kurprinz); this was because all the pregnancies of the Electress Amalie, except for one daughter, ended in a stillbirth.

His aunt, the Dauphine of France, had wanted to engage her daughter Marie Zéphyrine of France to Anthony, but Marie Zéphyrine died in 1755. Another French candidate was Marie Zéphyrine's sister Marie Clothilde (later Queen of Sardinia) but again nothing happened.

In Turin on 29 September 1781 (by proxy) and again in Dresden on 24 October 1781 (in person), Anthony married firstly with the Princess Maria Carolina of Savoy, daughter of the King Victor Amadeus III of Sardinia and Maria Antonia Ferdinanda of Spain. Caroline died after only one year of marriage, on 28 December 1782 having succumbed to smallpox. They had no children.

In Florence on 8 September 1787 (by proxy) and again in Dresden on 18 October 1787 (in person), Anthony entered his second marriage, to the Archduchess Maria Theresia of Austria (Maria Theresia Josephe Charlotte Johanna), daughter of the Grand Duke Leopold I of Tuscany, later Emperor Leopold II. Mozart's opera Don Giovanni was originally intended to be performed in honor of his bride for a visit to Prague on 14 October 1787, as she traveled between Vienna and Dresden for the in-person ceremony, and librettos were printed with mention of the names of both Anton and the archduchess. The premiere could not be arranged in time, however, so the opera The Marriage of Figaro was substituted on the express orders of the bride's uncle, the Emperor Joseph II. The choice of The Marriage of Figaro was considered improper for a new bride by many observers, and the archduchess left the opera theater early without seeing the entire work performed. Mozart complained bitterly of the intrigues surrounding this incident in a letter to his friend Gottfried von Jacquin that was written in stages between 15 October and 25 October 1787. Anthony was present in Prague in September 1791 for the first performance of Mozart's opera La clemenza di Tito, which was written as part of the coronation ceremonies of his father-in-law, the Emperor Leopold II, as King of Bohemia.

The couple had four children, but none survived to the age of two:

1. Maria Ludovika Auguste Fredericka Therese Franziska Johanna Aloysia Nepomucena Ignatia Anna Josepha Xaveria Franziska de Paula Barbara (b. Dresden, 14 March 1795 – d. Dresden, 25 April 1796) died in infancy.
2. Frederick Augustus (b. and d. Dresden, 5 April 1796) died at birth
3. Maria Johanna Ludovica Anna Amalia Nepomucena Aloysia Ignatia Xaveria Josepha Franziska de Chantal Eva Apollonia Magdalena Crescentia Vincentia (b. Dresden, 5 April 1798 – d. Dresden, 30 October 1799) died in infancy.
4. Maria Theresia (b. and d. Dresden, 15 October 1799) died at birth

Electress Amalie gave birth for last time in 1799 to another stillborn child. After this, it became apparent that Anthony would succeed to the Electorate of Saxony, which was raised to kingdom in 1806.

== King of Saxony ==
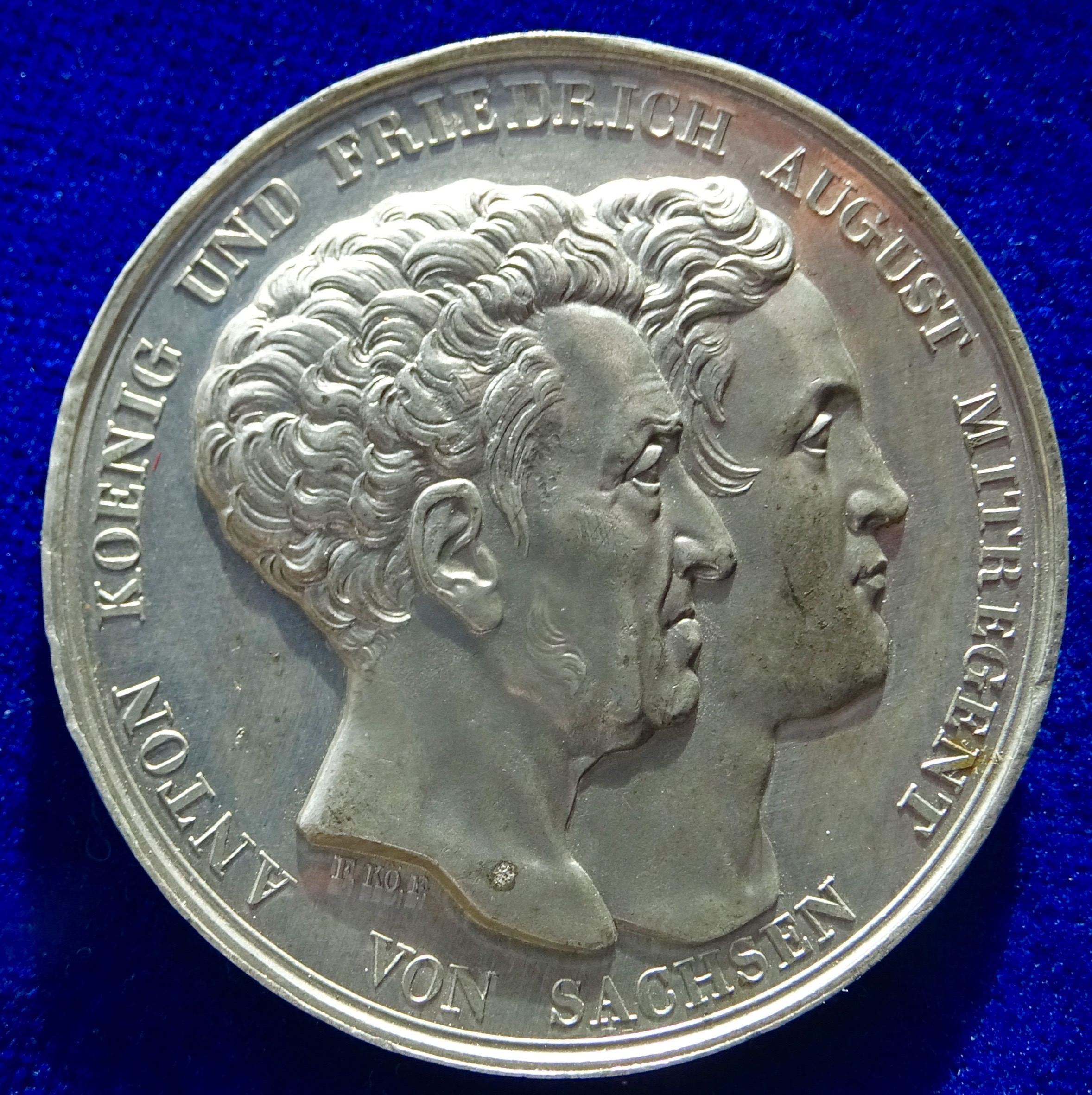
Medal of the introduction the Constitution of 1831. The obverse shows the conjoined heads of King Anthony and Co-Regent Friedrich August.

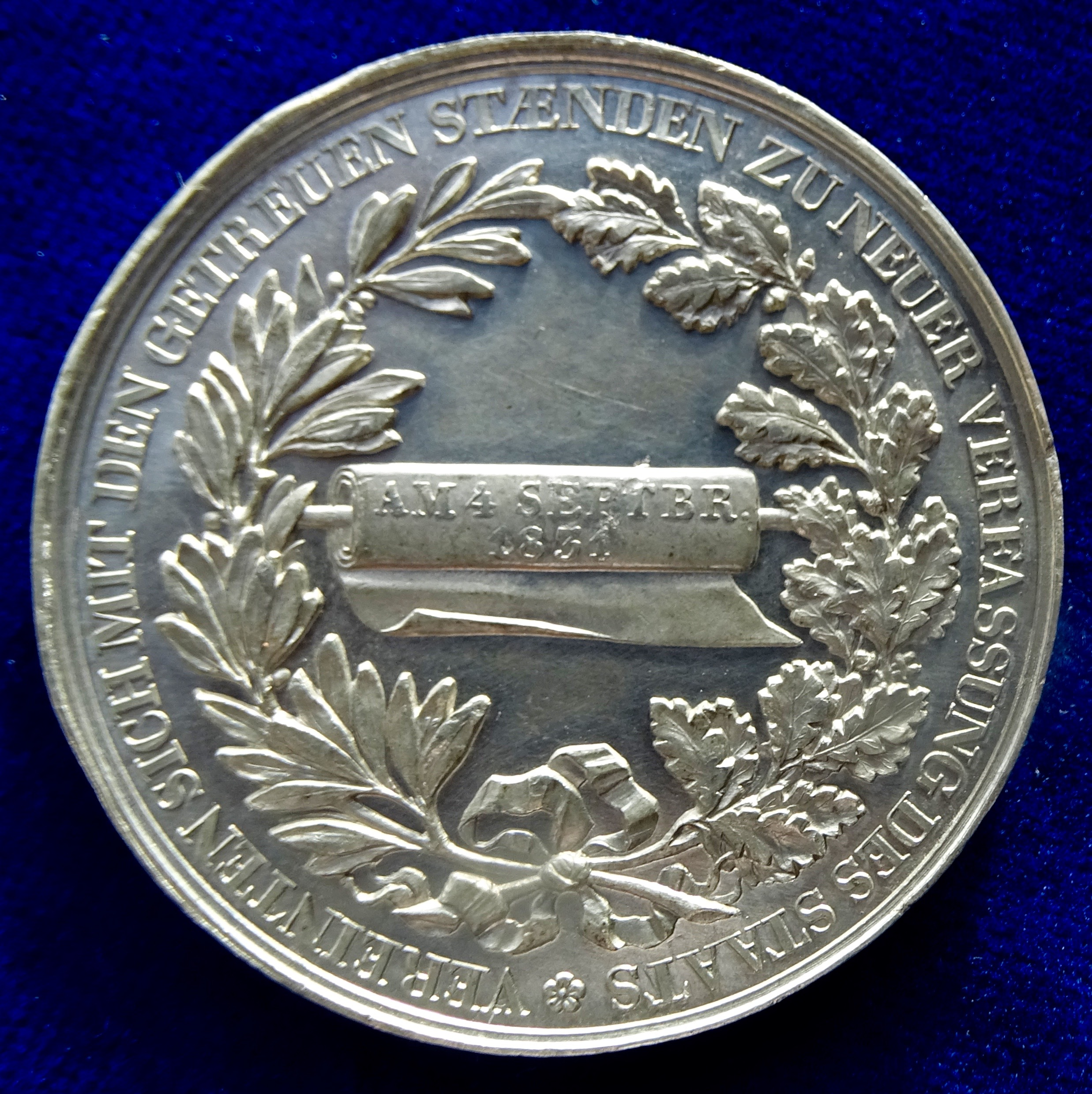
Pewter Medal of the new constitution, reverse.

Anthony succeeded his brother Frederick August I as King of Saxony upon the latter's death, on 5 May 1827. The 71-year-old new king was completely inexperienced in government, and hence had no intention of initiating profound changes in foreign or domestic policy.

Prussian diplomats discussed granting the Prussian Rhineland (predominantly Catholic) to Anthony (a Catholic) in exchange for Lutheran Saxony in 1827, but nothing came of these talks.

After the July Revolution of 1830 in France, disturbances in Saxony began in autumn. These were directed primarily against the old Constitution. Therefore, on 13 September the cabinet dismissed Count Detlev von Einsiedel, followed by Bernhard von Lindenau. Because the people wished to have a younger regent, Anthony agreed to appoint his nephew Frederick Augustus Prince Co-Regent (de: Prinz-Mitregenten). As another consequence of the disturbances, a new constitution was adopted in 1831 and came into effect on 4 September of that year. With it Saxony became a Constitutional monarchy and obtained a bi-cameral legislature and a responsible ministry, which replaced the old feudal estates. The constitution was more conservative than other constitutions existing at this time in the German Union. Nevertheless, it remained in force in Saxony until 1918. The king kept his exclusive sovereignty but was bound by the Government Business to cooperate with the Ministers and the decisions of both Chambers of the Estates (de: Kammern der Ständeversammlung) meeting. The entry of Saxony into the Zollverein in 1833 let trade, industry and traffic blossom farther.

Without surviving male issue, Anthony was succeeded as king by his nephew, Frederick Augustus II.

== Ancestors ==
Ancestors of Anthony, King of Saxony

8. Augustus II of Poland
4. Augustus III of Poland
9. Christiane Eberhardine of Bayreuth
2. Frederick Christian, Elector of Saxony
10. Joseph I, Holy Roman Emperor
5. Maria Josepha of Austria
11. Wilhelmine Amalia of Brunswick-Lüneburg
1. Anthony of Saxony
12. Maximilian II Emanuel, Elector of Bavaria
6. Charles VII, Holy Roman Emperor
13. Theresa Kunegunda Sobieska
3. Maria Antonia of Bavaria
14. Joseph I, Holy Roman Emperor (= 10)
7. Maria Amalia, Holy Roman Empress
15. Wilhelmine Amalia of Brunswick-Lüneburg (= 11)

== Footnotes ==
Anthony, King of Saxony House of Wettin Born: 27 December 1755 Died: 6 June 1836
Regnal titles
Preceded by Frederick Augustus I	King of Saxony; 1827–1836	Succeeded by Frederick Augustus II
