= Princess Maria Carolina of Savoy =

Maria Carolina of Savoy
- Electoral Princess of Saxony
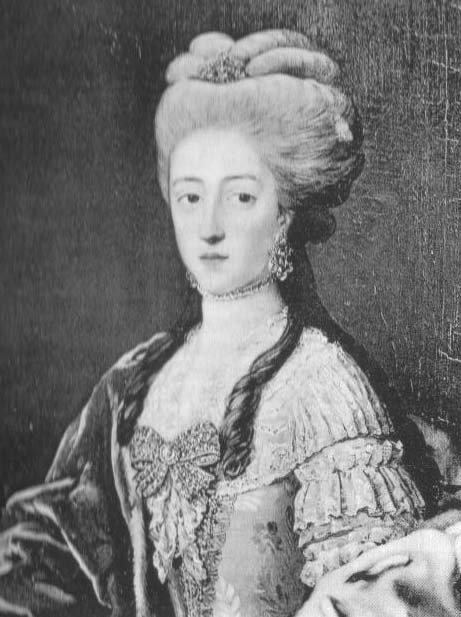
- Born: 17 January 1764; Royal Palace of Turin, Turin, Savoy
- Died: 28 December 1782 (aged 18); Dresden, Saxony
- Burial: Katholische Hofkirche
- Spouse: Anthony, Electoral Prince of Saxony (m. 1781)
Names
- Maria Carolina Antonietta Adelaide di Savoia
- House: Savoy
- Father: Victor Amadeus III of Sardinia
- Mother: Maria Antonia Ferdinanda of Spain
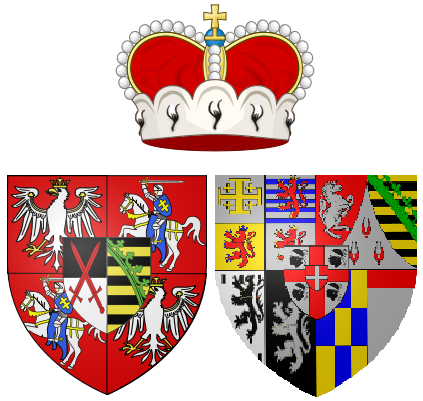

Maria Carolina of Savoy (Maria Carolina Antonietta Adelaide; 17 January 1764 – 28 December 1782) was a Princess of Savoy from her birth. She was the youngest daughter of the future Victor Amadeus III of Sardinia and married in 1781 to the Electoral Prince of Saxony. She died of smallpox aged 18.

== Biography ==
Born to the Duke and Duchess of Savoy at the Royal Palace of Turin, she was the couple's tenth child and sixth daughter.

Her sisters included the future granddaughters-in-law of Louis XV of France, Princess Maria Giuseppina, who married the future Louis XVIII in 1771, and Princess Maria Teresa, wife of the future Charles X, married in 1773. Her sisters' brother in law was the unfortunate Louis XVI.

Her brothers included the last three kings of Sardinia from the main line; the future Charles Emmanuel IV, Victor Emmanuel I and Charles Felix of Sardinia. Her father became king of Sardinia in 1773 at the death of her grandfather Charles Emmanuel III of Sardinia who had ruled Sardinia for 43 years.

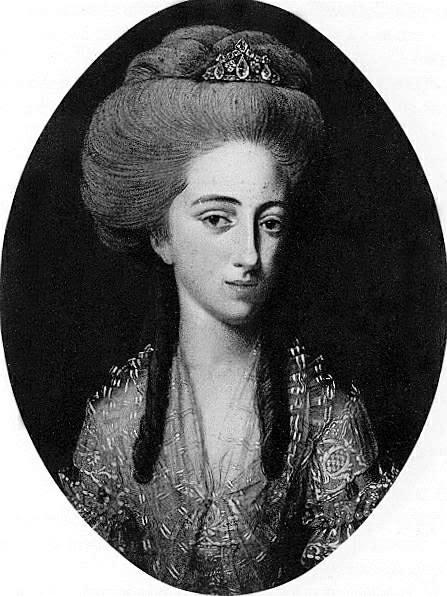
Portrait of Maria Carolina, c. 1781-1782

Her father decided that Maria Carolina would marry Prince Anthony of Saxony, who at the time was the Electoral Prince of Saxony, the heir to the Electorate. He was the fifth but third surviving son of Frederick Christian, Elector of Saxony, and Maria Antonia of Bavaria. Anthony's first cousins included the future Louis XVIII and Charles X of France, Maria Carolina's brothers-in-law. The couple also were joint first cousins of Charles IV of Spain and Ferdinand I of the Two Sicilies, Maria Carolina through her Spanish mother and Anthony through his father. Another first cousin of Maria Carolina was the famous princesse de Lamballe

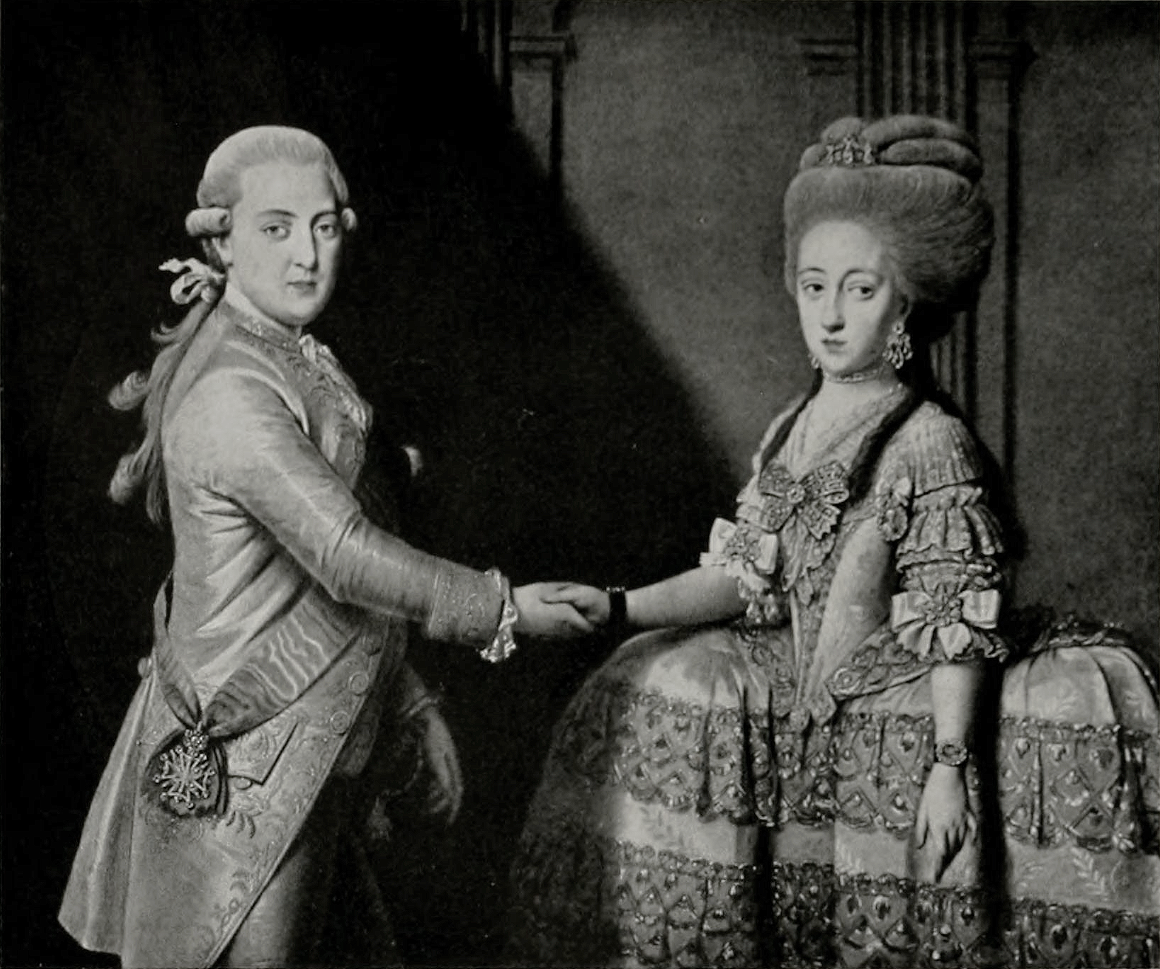
Portrait of Princess Maria Carolina and her husband, c. 1781-1782

Despite the pleas of Maria Carolina, she was married by proxy at the Palazzina di caccia of Stupinigi on 29 September 1781 followed by another ceremony in Dresden on 24 October 1781 with her actual groom. The celebrations in Savoy were lavish with parties at the Royal Palace of her birth and at the Palazzo Gontieri.

Maria Carolina left her home reluctantly in September 1781. Her family accompanied her as far as Vercelli when she had to be pushed out of the carriage to depart. She arrived at Augsburg, modern-day Germany on 14 October. Upon her arrival, she ranked as one of the highest females at the Saxon court, Anthony's mother Maria Antonia of Bavaria died in 1780. The highest-ranking female was Amalie of Zweibrücken-Birkenfeld, wife of Frederick Augustus III, then the ruler Elector of Saxony.

Not happy with her adopted home, she caught Smallpox and died in Dresden 28 December 1782. Popular in her native land, she was remembered in an old folk song composed in her honor after her early death:

"Principessa Maria Carolina Antonietta
di Savoia! Lo sposo da me scelto v'aspetta:
il Duca di Sassonia: Marcantonio Clemente."
...Così parlava il padre, il Re, solennemente

— Guido Gozzano, Poesie Sparse, Carolina di Savoia.

After her death, Anthony married Maria Theresa of Austria and had four children all of whom died in infancy. Her husband succeeded as King of Saxony in 1827 at the age of 71. She is buried at crypt number 30 at the Katholische Hofkirche, Dresden.

== Ancestry ==
Ancestors of Princess Maria Carolina of Savoy

8. Victor Amadeus II of Sardinia
4. Charles Emmanuel III of Sardinia
9. Anne Marie of Orléans
2. Victor Amadeus III of Sardinia
10. Ernest Leopold, Landgrave of Hesse-Rotenburg
5. Polyxena of Hesse-Rotenburg
11. Eleonore of Löwenstein-Wertheim-Rochefort
1. Maria Carolina of Savoy
12. Louis, Dauphin of France
6. Philip V of Spain
13. Maria Anna Victoria of Bavaria
3. Maria Antonia Ferdinanda of Spain
14. Odoardo Farnese, Hereditary Prince of Parma
7. Elisabeth Farnese
15. Dorothea Sophie of the Palatinate
