= Wedding of Princess Isabel and Gaston, Count of Eu =

1864 Brazilian wedding

Wedding of Princess Isabel and Prince Gaston
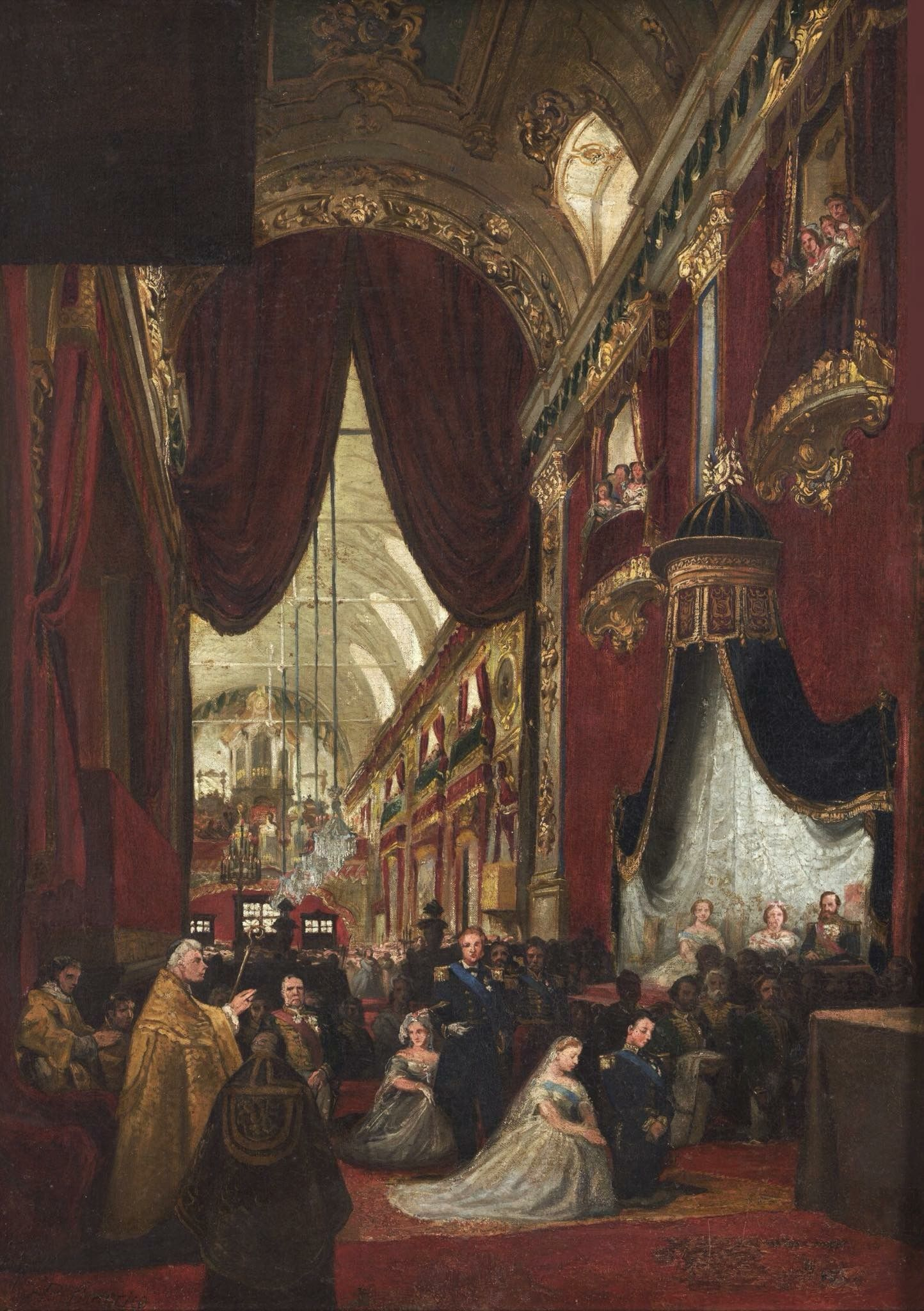
- Wedding painting done by Pedro Américo
- Date: 15 October 1864; 161 years ago
- Venue: Old Cathedral of Rio de Janeiro
- Location: Rio de Janeiro, Brazil
- Participants: Princess Isabel; Prince Gaston

The marriage of Isabel, Princess Imperial of Brazil and Prince Gaston, Count of Eu was a dynastic union between the heirs of the imperial houses of Brazil and France, held on October 15, 1864, at the Old Cathedral of Rio de Janeiro.

== Background ==
Isabel was the eldest daughter of Emperor Pedro II of Brazil and Empress Teresa Cristina of the Two Sicilies. As heir presumptive to the Brazilian throne, she had the title of Princess Imperial of Brazil and was first in the line of succession to her father. Gaston was the eldest son of Louis, Duke of Némours and Princess Victoria of Saxe-Coburg-Kohary, and the grandson of King Louis-Philippe I of France.

The marriage between Isabel and Gastão was the result of a political alliance between Pedro II and Louis Philippe I, who sought to strengthen ties between the two monarchies and contain the expansionist ambitions of the United States of America and Great Britain in Latin America. Furthermore, the marriage also aimed to guarantee dynastic continuity in Brazil, since Isabel was the only surviving daughter of Pedro II and his wife was considered infertile after several miscarriages.

== Negotiations ==
Negotiations for marriage began in 1863, when Pedro II sent a letter to the Duke of Némours, proposing the union between his children. The Duke accepted the proposal and sent a favorable response to the Brazilian emperor. Then, preparations for the ceremony began, which involved diplomatic, religious and financial issues.

== Ceremony ==
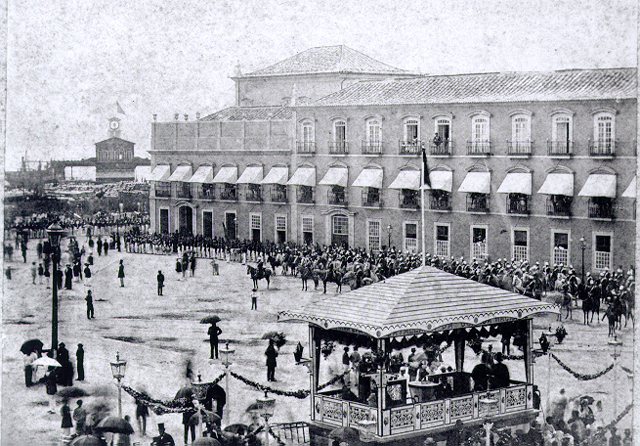
The Imperial Palace of Rio de Janeiro being prepared for the wedding ceremony of Princess Isabel and Prince Gaston.

The ceremony was held in two stages: the first was the proxy marriage, which took place on August 28, 1864, at the Royal Chapel of Dreux, France. On this occasion, Gastão was represented by his younger brother, Prince Augusto de Orléans. The second was the in-person wedding, which took place on October 15, 1864, at the Old Cathedral of Rio de Janeiro. On that occasion, Isabel and Gastão met for the first time and exchanged their marriage vows in front of Archbishop Dom Manuel Joaquim da Silveira.

The wedding was a major social event in Brazil, which was attended by civil and military authorities, members of the nobility and the diplomatic corps, as well as a large popular crowd that followed the wedding procession through the city streets. The couple received many gifts and tributes, such as jewelry, medals, paintings, poems and music. One of the most famous was the "Wedding March", composed by Francisco Manuel da Silva especially for the occasion.

== Consequences ==
Isabel and Gastão had three children: Pedro de Alcântara, Luís Maria and Antônio Gastão. These children were the last members of the Brazilian imperial family to be born in Brazil, before the proclamation of the Republic in 1889.
