= Wedding of Crown Prince Tupoutoʻa ʻUlukalala and Sinaitakala Fakafanua =

2012 Tongan royal wedding

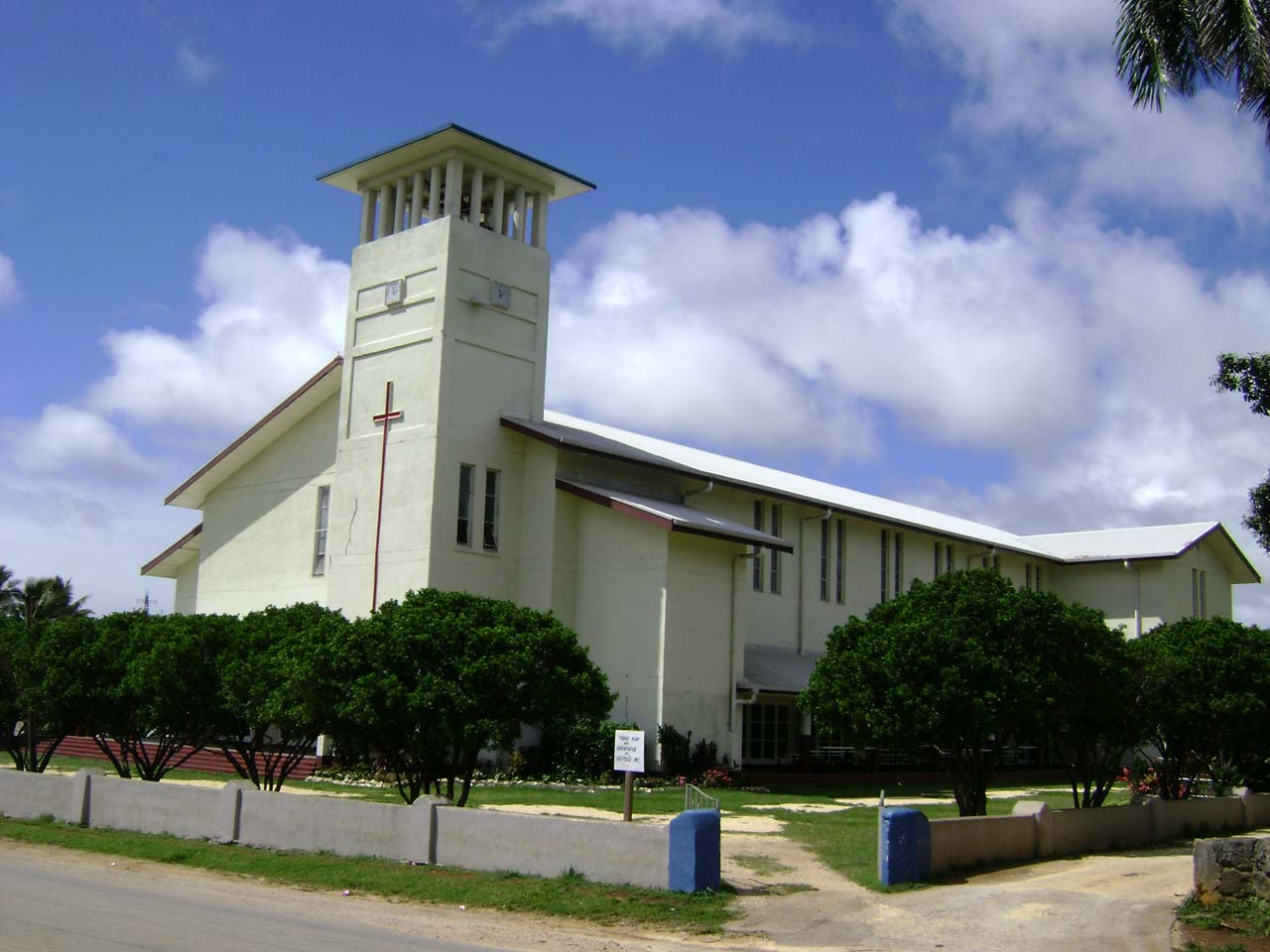
Centennial Church in Nuku'alofa, site of the royal wedding.

The wedding of Crown Prince Tupouto'a 'Ulukalala and Sinaitakala Fakafanua was held on 12 July 2012, at the Centennial Church in Nukuʻalofa, Tonga. Tongan Crown Prince Tupoutoʻa ʻUlukalala married Sinaitakala Fakafanua, his second cousin and 26th in line to the throne, during the ceremony.

The wedding marked the first marriage of a Tongan Crown Prince in sixty-five years. However, the union caused some controversy among Tongans, as the bride and groom are second cousins.

== Background ==
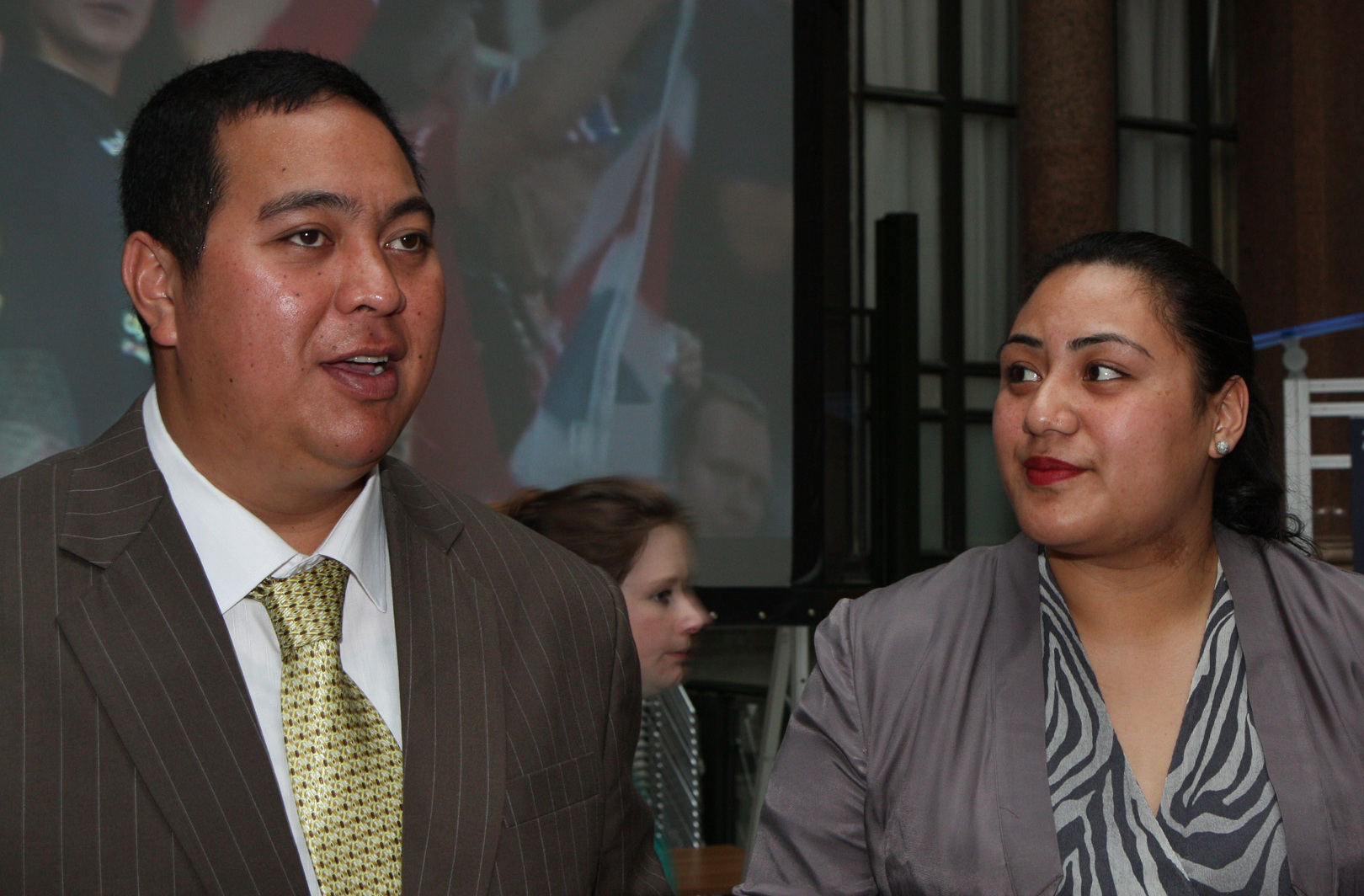
Ulukalala and Fakafanua at an Asia Pacific event in London in 2012.

Tupouto'a 'Ulukalala became Crown Prince of Tonga and first in line in royal succession in March 2012 following the death of King George Tupou V and the ascension of Tupou VI to the throne. The wedding ceremony marked the end of Tonga's one-hundred-day mourning period marking the death of George Tupou V, who died in March. The Crown Prince is the son of Tupou VI and the nephew of the late King George Tupou V.

All royal marriages in Tonga are arranged. Under Tongan royal protocol and tradition, members of the royal family may only marry members of Tongan nobility to maintain the royal bloodline. The bride, Sinaitakala Fakafanua, is also a member of the royal family and 26th person in the line of succession to inherit the throne.

Queen Nanasipau'u Tuku'aho, the wife of the current king, personally arranged the marriage between Crown Prince Tupouto'a 'Ulukalala and Sinaitakala Fakafanua. The queen pushed for a July wedding, even though the royal family must continue to wear black until February 2013 to mark George Tupou V's death. The queen's arrangement was reportedly opposed by her husband, King Tupou VI, who questioned whether it was appropriate for second cousins to marry.

The Prince was 27 years old at the time of the 2012 wedding, while the bride was 25 years old.

== Ceremony ==
Earlier in the week, a Ma'utohi ceremony was held to mark the issuance of their marriage license. The Ma'utohi was followed by a reception, held at Fakafanua's home.

The wedding ceremony was held at the Centenary Church of the Free Wesleyan Church of Tonga in Nuku'alofa on 12 July 2012. Tupouto'a 'Ulukalala became the first Crown Prince to marry in sixty-five years. The groom wore grey and black morning dress, while the bride wore a long sleeve, lace wedding dress with a veil that reached the floor of the church.

More than 2,000 guests attended the ceremony, including chiefly families from Samoa and Fiji. Noticeably absent from the ceremony were queen mother Halaevalu Mataʻaho ʻAhomeʻe and her daughter (king's sister), Princess Pilolevu, who disapproved of the marriage.

Members of the international media visiting Tonga to cover the wedding were given detailed instructions on how to behave during the ceremony. Photography was banned in sacred areas, with the government warning that it would confiscate or delete any photos taken in prohibited places. Photographers were asked to sit on the ground and "stand up quickly" to take a photo before sitting back down. Female journalists could not wear sleeveless dresses or shirts and men were to wear suits and ties. Umbrellas, hats, and sunglasses were banned throughout the wedding, while gum, food and drinks were not allowed at the Tongan Royal Palace.

== Controversy ==
The marriage between the Crown Prince and Fakafanua caused much controversy over the practice of marrying closely related cousins. The two of them are double second cousins (that is, Fakafanua's father and mother are each the first cousin of the prince's father). The wedding between the cousins was openly criticised by members of Tongan political and royal circles. A leader of New Zealand's Tongan community noted that there is no word for cousin in the Tongan language; cousins are considered and called "brother" or "sister", which reinforces the controversy among ordinary Tongans.

According to royal sources, King Tupou VI opposed the marriage due to their close relations and made his disapproval known to members of the royal family. (The king's wife, Queen Nanasipau'u, had arranged the royal wedding.) Two prominent members of the Tongan royal family, queen mother Halaevalu Mataʻaho ʻAhomeʻe and the king's sister, Princess Pilolevu refused to attend the ceremony. Daughter of Princess Pilolevu, Hon. Frederica Tuita, who is ninth in line to the throne, openly condemned the union, calling the royal arranged marriage "extremely arrogant and only perpetuated the motive behind social climbers."

Political figures and members of the Tongan community also weighed in on the controversy. Pro-democracy leader 'Akilisi Pohiva criticised the wedding, telling TVNZ, "They are too close...I do not know about biological effects of two close bloods mixed together, but I think they need new blood from outside." A leader of Tongans living in New Zealand, Will Ilolahia stated that many Tongans opposed the second cousins' marriage, but were unwilling to speak out publicly. Speculation also centred on possible genetic disorders that may result from a marriage of two close relatives.

Lord Vaea, an uncle of the Crown Prince, defended the marriage saying, "It's a new beginning for the royal household. They are both in their 20s, we are looking at that to preserve that constitutional monarchy within Tonga." A New Zealand geneticist noted that there is "only a slight risk" of genetic disorders for the offspring of cousins who marry.

In addition to the controversy over royal genetics, the wedding took place amid economic and political uncertainty. Tonga was projected to have the slowest economic growth in the Pacific Islands region during 2012. The royal family agreed to pay for the costs of the wedding; past weddings had been covered by the Tongan government. The government of Tonga may also face a potential vote of no confidence in the week following the wedding, adding to the country's political and economic woes.
