= FitzGeorge =

- Language: English

Origin
- Language: Norman French

Other names
- Variant form: Fitzgeorge

FitzGeorge or Fitzgeorge is an English and Norman French surname, and may refer to:

== Surname ==
- Adolphus FitzGeorge (1846–1922), Royal Navy officer
- Augustus FitzGeorge (1847–1933), British Army officer
- George FitzGeorge (1843–1907), British Army officer
- Olga FitzGeorge (1877–1928), English socialite and businessperson
- Rosa Frederica Baring FitzGeorge (1854–1927), English socialite
- Sarah Fairbrother, known as Mrs. FitzGeorge (1814–1890), English actress and wife of Prince George, Duke of Cambridge
- Victor FitzGeorge-Balfour (1913–1994), British Army officer

== Middle name ==
- George FitzGeorge Hamilton (1898–1918), British Army officer
- Richard Fitzgeorge de Stacpoole, 1st Duke de Stacpoole (1787–1848), Anglo-French aristocrat
