= George FitzGeorge Hamilton =

British Army officer (1898–1918)

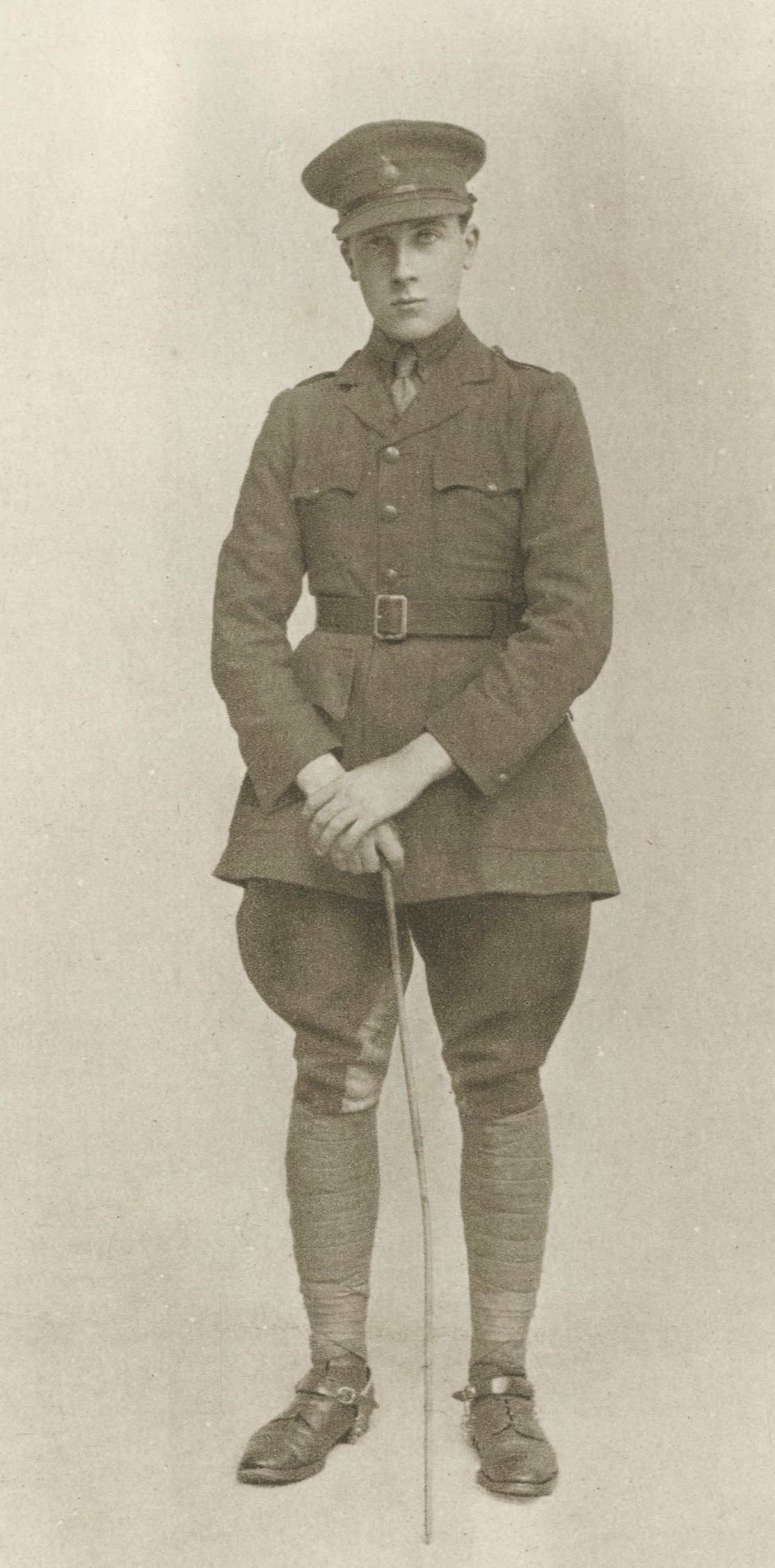
- FitzGeorge Hamilton in 1918
- Born: George Edward Archibald Augustus FitzGeorge Hamilton; 30 December 1898; London, England
- Died: 18 May 1918 (aged 19); Warlincourt-lès-Pas, France
- Burial place: Warlincourt Halte British Cemetery, Saulty; 50.197998°N 2.518021°E
- Relatives: Sir Archibald Hamilton, 5th Baronet (father); Olga FitzGeorge (mother); Robert Charlton Lane (stepfather); Jane Lane Hohler Scrivener (half-sister); Sir Adolphus FitzGeorge (grandfather); Prince George, Duke of Cambridge (great-grandfather)
- Military career
- Allegiance: United Kingdom
- Branch: British Army
- Service years: 1917–1918
- Rank: Second Lieutenant
- Unit: Grenadier Guards
- Conflicts: First World War: Western Front †
- Awards: British War Medal; Victory Medal
- Memorials: Winchester College War Cloister; St Mary's Church, Iping

George Edward Archibald Augustus FitzGeorge Hamilton (30 December 1898 – 18 May 1918) was a British Army officer during the First World War and a distant relative of the British royal family. He was the only son of Sir Archibald Hamilton, 5th Baronet and Olga FitzGeorge, and was the heir to the Hamilton baronetcies of Trebinshun House and Marlborough House.

FitzGeorge Hamilton's godparents were his great-grandfather, Prince George, Duke of Cambridge, and the Duke and Duchess of York (later titled as George V and Queen Mary). His parents divorced in 1902, and during his adolescence he attended Hawtreys, Winchester College, and the Royal Military College, Sandhurst. In 1917, FitzGeorge Hamilton was commissioned as a second lieutenant in the Grenadier Guards, the regiment in which his great-grandfather, the Duke of Cambridge, also served. He served in the First World War and was killed during an aerial bombing raid in Warlincourt-lès-Pas, France, in 1918. Following his father's death in 1939, the Hamilton baronetcies of Trebinshun House and Marlborough House passed to FitzGeorge Hamilton's uncle Sir Thomas Sydney Perceval Hamilton.

== Early life and family ==
George Edward Archibald Augustus FitzGeorge Hamilton was born on 30 December 1898 in London. He was the eldest child and only son of Archibald Hamilton (1876–1939) and his first wife Olga FitzGeorge (1877–1928). FitzGeorge Hamilton was named for his maternal great-grandfather, Prince George, Duke of Cambridge (1819–1904), Commander-in-Chief of the Forces from 1856 to 1895; his paternal grandfather, Sir Edward Archibald Hamilton, 4th and 2nd Baronet (1843–1915); and his maternal great-uncle Colonel Sir Augustus FitzGeorge (1847–1933). He was given a double-barrelled surname composed of his parents' surnames.

FitzGeorge Hamilton's baptism was held at the Chapel Royal, St James's Palace, which was attended by his sponsors the Duke of Cambridge; Prince George, Duke of York; and Mary, Duchess of York, his first cousin twice-removed.

In 1900 a photographic portrait of FitzGeorge Hamilton with his mother, grandfather, and great-grandfather, entitled "Four Generations," was published in multiple periodicals in the United Kingdom and the United States. FitzGeorge Hamilton had an unnamed sister who was born and died on 5 May 1902.

== Childhood and education ==
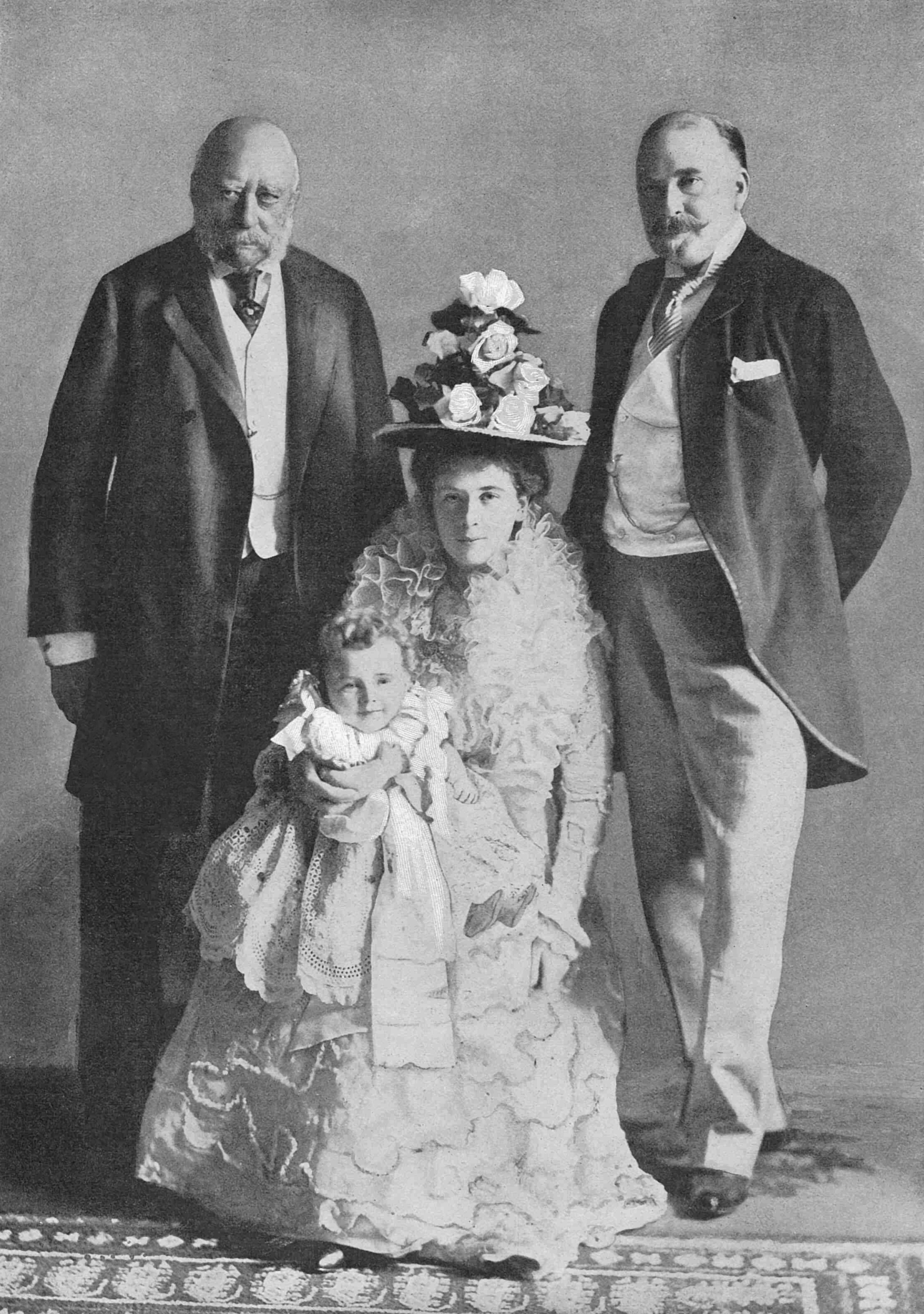
FitzGeorge Hamilton seated on the lap of his mother Olga FitzGeorge (center) with his great-grandfather Prince George, Duke of Cambridge (left) and his grandfather Sir Adolphus FitzGeorge (right) in 1900.

FitzGeorge Hamilton resided with his parents at Rotherhill House, west of Midhurst in Sussex. His parents divorced in 1902, and FitzGeorge Hamilton's father was assigned as his legal guardian. FitzGeorge Hamilton's mother remarried in 1905 to Robert Charlton Lane, and his father remarried in 1906 to Algorta Child.

FitzGeorge Hamilton received his early education at Hawtreys (also known as St Michael's School) in Westgate-on-Sea, and then he attended Winchester College in Winchester from 1912 until 1915. Following the death of his paternal grandfather in October 1915, FitzGeorge Hamilton's father inherited the Hamilton baronetcies of Trebinshun House and Marlborough House and became titled as Sir Archibald Hamilton, 5th and 3rd Baronet; thus, FitzGeorge Hamilton became the baronetcies' heir apparent. Because FitzGeorge Hamilton had always intended to join the British Army, he entered the Royal Military College, Sandhurst, in 1916, following the completion of his studies at Winchester College. FitzGeorge Hamilton was among the college's successful examination candidates.

== Military career ==
FitzGeorge Hamilton obtained a commission as a Second Lieutenant in the Grenadier Guards, an infantry regiment of the British Army, on 1 May 1917. His great-grandfather, the Duke of Cambridge, served as a Colonel of the Grenadier Guards from 1862 until his death in 1904. In late 1917, FitzGeorge Hamilton proceeded to France to serve in the First World War with the Grenadier Guards. In January 1918, while in France, he joined the 1st Battalion as part of No. 4 Company.

== Death and legacy ==
On 18 May 1918, FitzGeorge Hamilton's battalion suffered an aerial bombing raid by enemy aircraft in Warlincourt-lès-Pas, France. Three officers, including FitzGeorge Hamilton, were killed in this raid on 18 May, and another officer died on 19 May as a result of his injuries from the bombing. FitzGeorge Hamilton was aged 19 at the time of his death. According to family legend, the four officers had departed on leave, but returned to Warlincourt-lès-Pas to retrieve FitzGeorge Hamilton's leave pass which he had left behind. His commanding officer said of FitzGeorge Hamilton:

He was particularly keen in his profession and had all the makings of a really good officer and Grenadier. He was well liked by all, and will be greatly missed.

FitzGeorge Hamilton was subsequently interred at Warlincourt Halte British Cemetery near Saulty in grave XII.B.6. With the permission of King George V, a memorial service was held for FitzGeorge Hamilton on 18 June 1918, at the Chapel Royal, St James's Palace, where he had been baptized 19 years prior. His service was officiated by Edgar Sheppard, Sub-Dean of the Chapel Royal. Queen Alexandra was represented at his memorial service by Sir Henry Streatfeild. Memorials were also erected in his honour within the "Outer G3" section of the Winchester College War Cloister, and at St Mary's Church in Iping, near Midhurst. FitzGeorge Hamilton was posthumously awarded the British War Medal and the Victory Medal.

Following the war, FitzGeorge Hamilton's mother Olga gave birth to a daughter, Jane (4 June 1919 – 20 September 2014), with her second husband Robert Charlton Lane. His mother died in 1929, and in her will, she bequeathed a gold cup presented to FitzGeorge Hamilton by the Duke of Cambridge to the officers' mess of the 1st Battalion, Grenadier Guards. His mother also left £1,000 to Winchester College for the establishment of the George FitzGeorge Hamilton Fund to assist in the education of the children of Wykehamists who had died in the First World War.

FitzGeorge Hamilton's father Sir Archibald Hamilton sold his Iping House estate in 1919, and later converted to Islam in December 1923 and changed his name to Sir Abdullah Archibald Hamilton. He married his third wife Lilian Maud Austen in 1927, and she subsequently converted to Islam and changed her name to Lady Miriam Hamilton. Sir Abdullah Archibald Hamilton died in 1939 in Selsey, Sussex, and the Hamilton baronetcies of Trebinshun House and Marlborough House passed to his brother Sir Thomas Sydney Perceval Hamilton.

== Ancestry ==
Through his father, FitzGeorge Hamilton was a grandson of Sir Edward Archibald Hamilton, 4th Baronet of Trebinshun House and 2nd Baronet of Marlborough House, and his wife Mary Elizabeth Gill. Also through his father, FitzGeorge Hamilton was a direct descendant of William Hamilton, one of the five Kentish Petitioners of 1701. FitzGeorge Hamilton was a great-great-grandson of both Admiral Sir Edward Hamilton, 1st Baronet (1772–1851) and Member of Parliament Panton Corbett (1785–1855) of the Corbet family. He was also a direct male-line descendant of James Hamilton, 1st Earl of Abercorn (1575–1618), and he was descended from James II of Scotland through his daughter Mary Stewart, Countess of Arran.

Through his mother, FitzGeorge Hamilton was a grandson of Rear Admiral Sir Adolphus FitzGeorge (1846–1922) and his wife Sophia Jane Holden (1857–1920). He was a great-grandson of Prince George, Duke of Cambridge and his wife Sarah Fairbrother (1816–1890), and a great-great-grandson of Prince Adolphus, Duke of Cambridge (1774–1850) and Princess Augusta of Hesse-Kassel (1797–1889). Because his maternal great-grandfather's marriage was in contravention to the Royal Marriages Act of 1772, FitzGeorge Hamilton's grandfather and great-uncles Colonel Sir Augustus FitzGeorge and Colonel George FitzGeorge (1843–1907) were ineligible to inherit the Dukedom of Cambridge.

Ancestors of George FitzGeorge Hamilton

8. John James Edward Hamilton
4. Sir Edward Archibald Hamilton, 4th Baronet
9. Favoretta Corbett
2. Sir Archibald Hamilton, 5th Baronet
10. Joseph Gill
5. Mary Elizabeth Gill
1. George FitzGeorge Hamilton
12. Prince George, Duke of Cambridge
6. Sir Adolphus FitzGeorge
13. Sarah Fairbrother
3. Olga FitzGeorge
14. Thomas Holden
7. Sophia Jane Holden
15. Penelope Sofiano

== Bibliography ==
- Camp, Anthony J. (2007). Royal Mistresses and Bastards: Fact and Fiction 1714–1936. London: Anthony J. Camp. ISBN 978-0-9503308-2-2. OCLC 260200087.
- Commonwealth War Graves Commission (2018). "Second Lieutenant Hamilton, GEAF". Commonwealth War Graves Commission website. Maidenhead, Berkshire: Commonwealth War Graves Commission. Archived from the original on 9 July 2018.
- Dod's Peerage, Ltd. (1917). Dod's Peerage, Baronetage, Knightage, etc. of Great Britain and Ireland for 1917. London: Simkin, Marshall, Hamilton, Kent & Co., Ltd. OCLC 37641333 – via Internet Archive.
- Huberty, Michel (1981). L'Allemagne dynastique: Brunswick, Nassau, Schwarzbourg. Le Perreux-sur-Marne: Alain Giraud. ISBN 978-2-901138-03-7. OCLC 768862988.
- Johnston, George Harvey (1909). The Heraldry of the Hamiltons: With Notes on All the Males of the Family, Description of the Arms, Plates and Pedigrees. Edinburgh & London: W. & A.K. Johnston. OCLC 5166014 – via Internet Archive.
- McNaughton, C. Arnold (1973). The Book of Kings: A Royal Genealogy. Vol. 2. London: Garnstone Press. OCLC 632582714.
- Mosley, Charles, ed. (2003). "Burke's Peerage, Baronetage & Knightage". 2 (107 ed.). Wilmington, Delaware: Burke's Peerage (Genealogical Books) Ltd. OCLC 224106746.
- Pine, Leslie Gilbert (1972). The New Extinct Peerage 1884–1971: Containing Extinct, Abeyant, Dormant and Suspended Peerages With Genealogies and Arms. London: Heraldry Today. OCLC 866089055.
- Powysland Club (1892). "Collections Historical & Archaeological Relating to Montgomeryshire and Its Borders". XXVI. London: Charles J. Clark. OCLC 847894046 – via Internet Archive.
- Selsey57 Voluntary Community WWI Project (2018). "George E A A FitzGeorge Hamilton". Selsey57 Voluntary Community WWI Project website. Selsey, West Sussex. Archived from the original on 9 July 2018.
- Stock, Elliot, ed. (May 1904). "The Genealogical Magazine: A Journal of Family Heraldry & Pedigrees". Vol. 7–8. London: Elliot Stock. OCLC 173399016. Archived from the original on 21 March 2019 – via Google Books.
- Weir, Alison (1989). Britain's Royal Families: The Complete Genealogy. London: The Bodley Head. ISBN 978-0-370-31310-8. OCLC 1008227480.
- Winchester College (2018). "Hamilton, George Edward Archibald Augustus FitzGeorge". Winchester College at War. Winchester, Hampshire: Winchester College. Archived from the original on 7 July 2018.
- Woking Muslim Mission and Literary Trust, ed. (1935). Charms of Islam: A Collection of Writings of Some of the Eminent Scholars. Woking, Surrey: The Woking Mosque. OCLC 717266954 – via Internet Archive.
