= Olga FitzGeorge =

English socialite, businesswoman, and granddaughter of Prince George, Duke of Cambridge

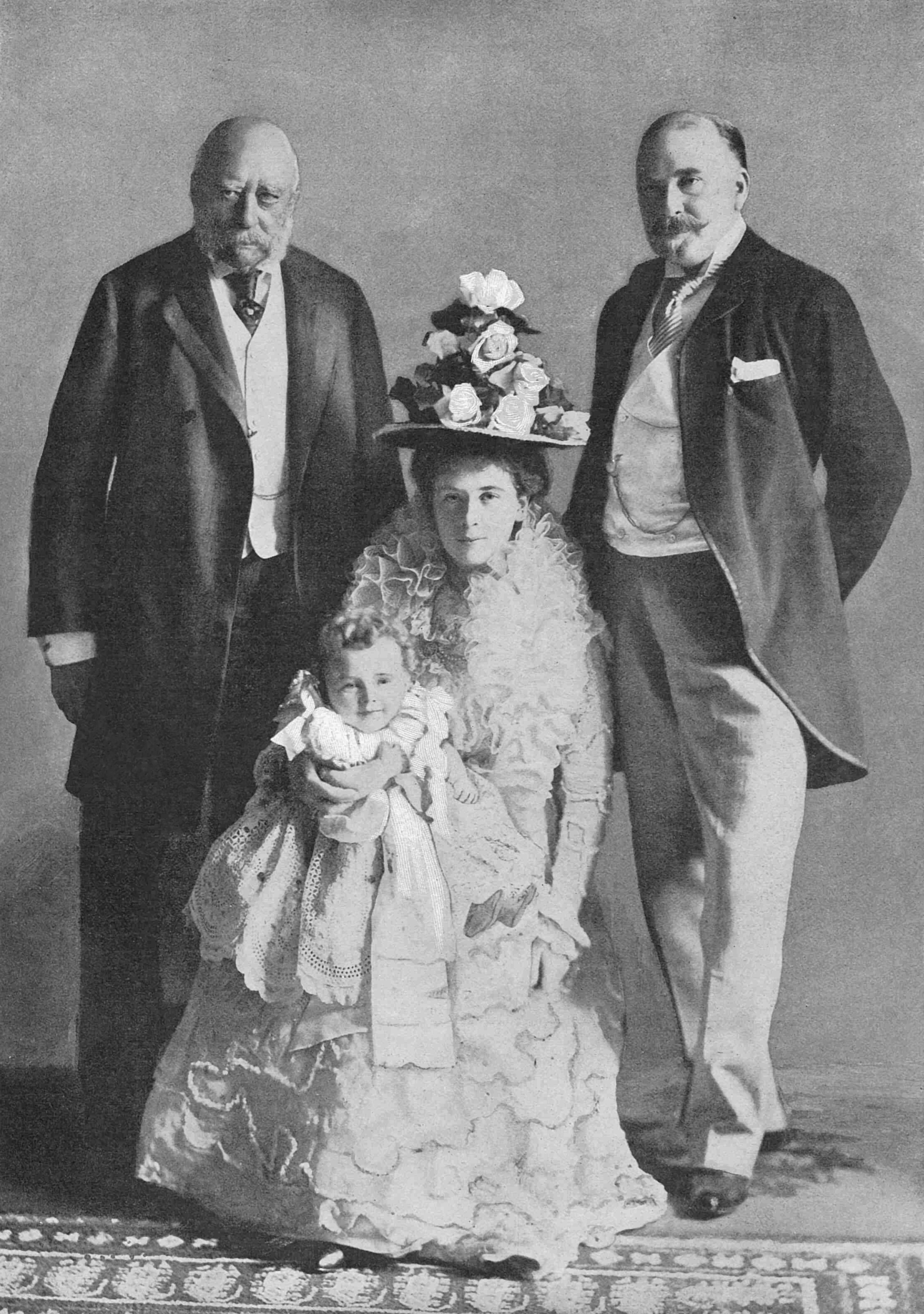
- FitzGeorge (centre) photographed with her grandfather Prince George, Duke of Cambridge, her father Sir Adolphus FitzGeorge, and her son George FitzGeorge Hamilton in 1900.
- Born: Olga Mary Adelaide FitzGeorge; 11 June 1877; Athens, Kingdom of Greece
- Died: 25 October 1928 (aged 51); Rouen, France
- Resting place: Glebe Manor, Warblington, Hampshire
- Spouse(s): Archibald Hamilton (m. 1897; div. 1902) Robert Charlton Lane (m. 1905)
- Children: With Hamilton: George FitzGeorge Hamilton unnamed daughter With Lane: Jane Lane Hohler Scrivener
- Parents: Sir Adolphus FitzGeorge (father); Sophia Jane Holden (mother)
- Relatives: George FitzGeorge (uncle); Sir Augustus FitzGeorge (uncle); Prince George, Duke of Cambridge (grandfather); Sarah Fairbrother (grandmother); Prince Adolphus, Duke of Cambridge (great-grandfather); Princess Augusta of Hesse-Kassel (great-grandmother); George III of the United Kingdom (great-great-grandfather)
- Family: By birth: FitzGeorge family, a morganatic branch of the House of Hanover; By marriage: Hamilton family

Olga FitzGeorge (Olga Mary Adelaide FitzGeorge Hamilton Lane; 11 June 1877 – 15 October 1928) was a British socialite, businessperson, and descendant of King George III through her paternal grandfather, Prince George, Duke of Cambridge. FitzGeorge was the only daughter and child of Rear Admiral Sir Adolphus FitzGeorge and Sophia Jane Holden FitzGeorge.

Born in Athens while her father was serving with the Mediterranean Fleet, FitzGeorge was the goddaughter of Queen Olga of Greece and her grandaunt Mary Adelaide, Duchess of Teck. During her childhood, FitzGeorge's parents allowed her to perform in plays for charitable events despite the misgivings of her great-grandmother Augusta, Duchess of Cambridge, and her grandfather, the Duke of Cambridge.

FitzGeorge was married first to Charles Edward Archibald Watkin Hamilton (later Sir Archibald Hamilton, 5th Baronet) in 1897. FitzGeorge was known for her lavish lifestyle, and she continued her extravagant behaviour throughout the course of this marriage, which increased her husband's debts and caused marital strife when Hamilton attempted to limit her expenditures. In order to achieve financial independence, FitzGeorge established a manicure and beauty salon on New Bond Street in London despite its annoyance to both the Hamilton family and the British royal family. FitzGeorge's first marriage, which ended in a highly publicized divorce in 1902, produced two children: a son, George Edward Archibald Augustus FitzGeorge Hamilton, in 1898 and an unnamed daughter who died shortly after her birth. FitzGeorge's son died in 1918 while serving with the Grenadier Guards in France during World War I.

FitzGeorge married lawyer Robert Charlton Lane in 1905, and the couple had a daughter, Mary Alice Olga Sofia Jane Lane Hohler Scrivener, in 1919. In 1908 FitzGeorge made headlines for her alleged affair with Arthur Clark Kennedy and was named in his divorce proceedings with his second wife. FitzGeorge died of an embolism at age 51 in Rouen, France, in 1928 and was interred at her Glebe Manor estate in Warblington, Hampshire. In her will, she bequeathed £1,000 to Winchester College for the establishment of the George FitzGeorge Hamilton Fund to assist in the education of the children of Wykehamists who died in World War I. FitzGeorge's daughter Jane, who later married British ambassador Ronald Stratford Scrivener, died in 2014.

== Early life and family ==
Olga Mary Adelaide FitzGeorge was born on 11 June 1877 as the daughter and only child of Rear Admiral Sir Adolphus FitzGeorge and his first wife Sophia Jane Holden FitzGeorge. She was born in Athens, where her father was serving with the Mediterranean Fleet of the Royal Navy. FitzGeorge was named for her two godmothers: the queen consort in her birthplace, Queen Olga of Greece, and her great-aunt Mary Adelaide, Duchess of Teck. Queen Olga gifted FitzGeorge with a pearl heart at her baptism.

Through her father, FitzGeorge was a granddaughter of Prince George, Duke of Cambridge, Commander-in-Chief of the Forces from 1856 to 1895, and his wife Sarah Fairbrother. Because her paternal grandparents' marriage was in contravention to the Royal Marriages Act of 1772, FitzGeorge's father and her uncles George FitzGeorge and Sir Augustus FitzGeorge were ineligible to inherit the Dukedom of Cambridge. Also through her father, FitzGeorge was a male-line descendant of Prince Adolphus, Duke of Cambridge and King George III. As a descendant of George III, FitzGeorge was also a first cousin twice-removed of Queen Victoria and a first cousin once-removed of Queen Mary, who was the daughter of her godmother the Duchess of Teck. Through her mother, FitzGeorge was the granddaughter of Thomas Holden of Winestead Hall and his wife Penelope Sofiano Holden. Holden was a wealthy businessman from whom FitzGeorge's parents received much of their fortune.

== Childhood and adolescence ==
As a child, FitzGeorge's parents allowed her to perform in plays and musicals for the benefit of charitable causes. In June 1882 she and her father performed in three plays at the Corn Exchange in Newark-on-Trent to raise funds for the construction of a local hospital there.

FitzGeorge's grandfather, the Duke of Cambridge, was urged by his mother Augusta, Duchess of Cambridge, to interfere in FitzGeorge's upbringing by her parents, and discouraged them from allowing her to participate in performances and public events. In 1884 the Duke worried about FitzGeorge's presence at a charity bazaar hosted by her mother at St James's Palace, despite it being patronized by Albert Edward, Prince of Wales, and his wife Alexandra, Princess of Wales. The Duke wrote to FitzGeorge's father on 15 July 1884, insisting that she should be "quietly dressed" at the bazaar and that "appearing on the stage is not desirable for this nice little girl".

In 1886 Olga served as a bridesmaid at the wedding of her maternal aunt Hélène Cecil Holden to John Louis Mitchell. She also attended a state ball hosted by Queen Victoria at Buckingham Palace in May 1895.

== First marriage ==
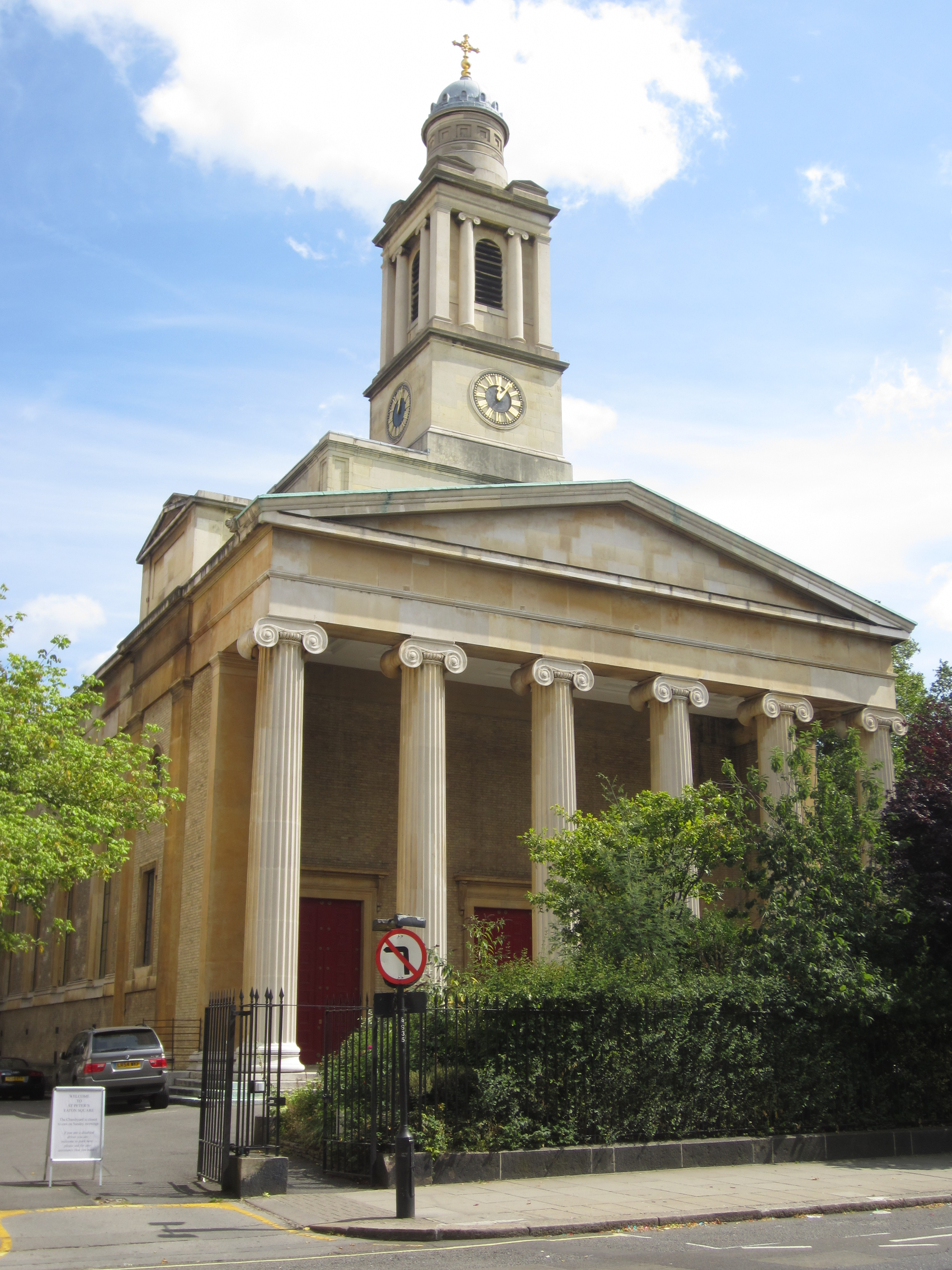
St Peter's Church, Eaton Square

FitzGeorge was married first to Charles Edward Archibald Watkin Hamilton, later to become Sir Archibald Hamilton, 5th Baronet, on 18 December 1897. Hamilton was the son of Sir Edward Archibald Hamilton, 4th Baronet, and his wife Mary Elizabeth Gill.

Their wedding was held at St Peter's Church, Eaton Square, Belgravia, and the wedding ceremony was presided over by Reverend Edgar Sheppard, Sub-Dean of the Chapels Royal, who was assisted by FitzGeorge's great-uncle Reverend Anthony Bailey and parish vicar Reverend John Storrs. FitzGeorge was given away by her father, and was attended by her cousins George FitzGeorge and Guy Holden and by eight bridesmaids: Violet Hodgson (her cousin), Baroness Fay de Steigar (Hamilton's cousin), Stella Faudel-Phillips, Wynford "Winnie" Kemball (daughter of General Arnold Burrowes Kemball), Lady Mary Pery, Lady Evelyn Bertie, and FitzGeorge's young cousins Iris and Daphne FitzGeorge. Hamilton's best man was a Mr. Earle.

FitzGeorge's veil of Honiton lace was a family heirloom previously worn by her mother, and was ornamented with orange blossoms specially sent from Cannes. She only wore one jewel, which was the pearl heart given to her at her baptism by her godmother Queen Olga of Greece. The train of her dress was carried by her pages, who wore sailor uniforms and hats labeled with "H.M.S. Olga." The wedding reception was held at the home of FitzGeorge's parents at 12 Eaton Square, Belgravia, and the couple honeymooned in Paris afterward.

Attendees at their wedding included FitzGeorge's grandfather the Duke of Cambridge, her uncle Colonel George FitzGeorge, the Prince and Princess of Wales, the Duchess of York, the Count and Countess of Casa Valencia, the Countess of Cottenham and her daughter Lady Mary Pepys, the Dowager Countess of Limerick, and her daughter Lady Florence Pery, the Countess of Lindsey, the Count and Countess de Morel, Prince Edward of Saxe-Weimar, the Duke and Duchess of Stackpoole, the Baron and Baroness de Steigar, Sir Walter Barttelot, 2nd Baronet, and Lady Barttelot, General Sir Henry de Bathe, 4th Baronet, and Lady de Bathe, Lieutenant-General Julian Hall, and Admiral Sir Reginald Macdonald and Lady Macdonald.

FitzGeorge received a gold chain bracelet with sapphires and diamonds from the Prince and Princess of Wales; a diamond and green enamel double horseshoe brooch from her godmother Queen Olga of Greece; a diamond pendant from her grandfather the Duke of Cambridge; a white Brussels lace fan from Prince George, Duke of York and Mary, Duchess of York; a bottle of perfume in a silver case from Alfred, Duke of Saxe-Coburg and Gotha; a white gauze fan inlaid with gold from her great-aunt Augusta, Grand Duchess of Mecklenburg-Strelitz; two gold bangles with diamond pendants from Prince Victor Duleep Singh; a green enamel and gold muff chain from the Prince and Princess of Löwenstein-Wertheim; and a silver sugar caster from Prince Adolphus of Teck, Princess Adolphus of Teck, and Prince Alexander of Teck. Prince Adolphus and Prince Alexander were the sons of FitzGeorge's great-aunt and godmother, the Duchess of Teck, who died the October preceding her wedding.

After their wedding, FitzGeorge and Hamilton resided at Rotherhill in Midhurst, Sussex. The following year, FitzGeorge and her husband held a celebration in honor of her grandfather the Duke of Cambridge at their residence in July 1898, which included Prince and Princess Edward of Saxe-Weimar, Maurice Gifford, and Sir Edward Archibald Hamilton, 4th Baronet.

FitzGeorge and Hamilton had two children George Edward Archibald Augustus FitzGeorge Hamilton, born in 1898 and killed in an aerial raid by enemy aircraft in France in 1918, aged 19, during the Great War, and an unnamed daughter who was born and died on 5 May 1902. At the baptism of their son George, the Duke of Cambridge and the Duke and Duchess of York stood as sponsors in person. In 1900 a photographic portrait of FitzGeorge with her grandfather, father, and her son George on her knee, which was entitled "Four Generations" was published in multiple periodicals in the United Kingdom and the United States.

=== Divorce ===
Prior to their marriage, FitzGeorge was known for her lavish lifestyle. She continued her extravagant behavior throughout the course of the marriage, which increased her husband's debts and caused marital strife when Hamilton attempted to limit her expenditures. In order to attain financial independence from Hamilton, FitzGeorge established a manicure and beauty salon on New Bond Street in London with her married name over the establishment's front door. Her business proved to be an annoyance for both her husband's family and the British royal family. Following its opening, Hamilton left and separated from FitzGeorge. In May 1901 Hamilton returned to his parents' residence at Devonshire Place while FitzGeorge resided at their marital residence at 15 Queens Mansions, Victoria Street in Victoria, London. Hamilton occasionally visited his wife and child, but his visits eventually ceased.

In response to his desertion, FitzGeorge filed for and was granted a decree of restitution of conjugal rights by Sir Francis Jeune in a divorce court on 28 July 1902. FitzGeorge was also granted custody of their son, George. Despite efforts by the royal family to reconcile FitzGeorge with her husband, she filed a petition for divorce from Hamilton. FitzGeorge was granted a divorce from Hamilton on 3 November 1902 on the grounds that her husband had abandoned FitzGeorge and engaged in extramarital misconduct with an unknown woman. Several of their wedding guests were present in the courtroom for their divorce ruling.

== Second marriage ==
Three years later, FitzGeorge married lawyer Robert Charlton Lane (26 January 1873 – 23 May 1943), son of Charles Thomas Lane, on 5 January 1905 in London. Following their marriage, FitzGeorge frequently traveled to New York. FitzGeorge and Lane had a residence at 1 South Eaton Place in Belgravia and an estate named Glebe Manor in Warblington near Havant in Hampshire.

In early 1908 FitzGeorge became involved in a divorce proceeding in Edinburgh between Arthur Clark Kennedy and his second wife, partly due to FitzGeorge's alleged relationship with Kennedy. Kennedy's wife claimed that FitzGeorge and Kennedy had traveled together to cities in Great Britain, Ireland, and France in 1906, and resided together in Bury St Edmunds in March and April of that year. FitzGeorge's own mother wrote a letter of sympathy to Kennedy's wife in which she stated, "I find we have no power to stop Olga's money. We cannot stop anybody doing anything, but can only pray for the best. Take care of yourself." Kennedy was not present for the divorce proceeding, and his wife was ultimately granted a divorce. Throughout the trial, FitzGeorge vacationed in Jamaica.

In 1916, during World War I, FitzGeorge's son George entered the Royal Military Academy Sandhurst, and in late 1917 he obtained a commission as a Second lieutenant in the British Army's Grenadier Guards, in which his great-grandfather the Duke of Cambridge had served. Only a few months later, on 18 May 1918, George was killed by a bomb from an airplane at Warlincourt near Arras, France. He was interred at Warlincourt Halte British Cemetery near Saulty.

Following the war, FitzGeorge and Lane became the parents of a daughter, Mary Alice Olga Sofia Jane Lane (4 June 1919 – 20 September 2014). FitzGeorge's mother Sophia died on 3 February 1920. She bequeathed certain items of jewellery (a gold bracelet that had belonged to Augusta, Duchess of Cambridge, and other diamond ornaments) in life interest to FitzGeorge with the remainder to Jane. FitzGeorge's father (at the age of 76) married Margaret Beatrice Daisy Watson in October 1920 in Pimlico; he died on 17 December 1922 in London.

== Later life, death, and legacy ==
FitzGeorge died on 15 October 1928 at age 51 in Rouen, French Third Republic. After a tour of Bayeux and a two-day stay at the Vieux Logis on Rue Saint Romain in Rouen, FitzGeorge died suddenly of an embolism as she was boarding her car to depart for Le Havre. Her remains were transferred from Le Havre to Southampton on 17 October, and her funeral was held at Warblington Church on 19 October. FitzGeorge was interred at her Glebe Manor estate in Warblington.

FitzGeorge's will was proved in the Principal Probate Registry on 9 February 1929 by her named executors: her husband and Edgar Oliver Goss. In her will, FitzGeorge left a gold cup presented to her son George by the Duke of Cambridge to the officers' mess of the 1st Battalion, Grenadier Guards, £100 to the Princess Louise Home for Girls in Kingston Hill, annuities of £15 each to her nurses Emily Hawkins and Nanny Gertrude Mills, and £40 to Robert Walker. FitzGeorge also left £1,000 to Winchester College for the establishment of the George FitzGeorge Hamilton Fund to assist in the education of the children of Wykehamists who had died in World War I. She left unsettled property totaling £20,150.

FitzGeorge's daughter Jane married first to Edward Christopher Hohler, son of Lieutenant Colonel Arthur Preston Hohler and Laline Annette Astell, on 14 November 1939 at St Thomas à Becket Church, Warblington. She and Hohler divorced in July 1961 in London. Jane then married Ronald Stratford Scrivener, son of Sir Patrick Scrivener, on 14 May 1962 in London. Scrivener served as the Ambassador of the United Kingdom to Panama. Jane died on 20 September 2014 at age 95, and her funeral service was held at St. Etheldreda's in Fulham. She had four children with her first husband, Edward Christopher Hohler:

- Olga Mary Hohler (11 October 1940 – 29 October 2019)
- Philippa Caroline Jane Hohler (born 13 January 1942)
- Frederick Christopher Gerald Hohler (born 30 August 1943)
- Robert Henry Adolphus Hohler (born 2 October 1947)

At the time of her death, Jane had 13 grandchildren and 13 great-grandchildren.

== Ancestry ==
Ancestors of Olga FitzGeorge

16. George III of the United Kingdom
8. Prince Adolphus, Duke of Cambridge
17. Charlotte of Mecklenburg-Strelitz
4. Prince George, Duke of Cambridge
18. Prince Frederick of Hesse-Kassel
9. Princess Augusta of Hesse-Kassel
19. Princess Caroline of Nassau-Usingen
2. Sir Adolphus FitzGeorge
10. John Fairbrother
5. Sarah Fairbrother
11. Mary Tucker
1. Olga FitzGeorge
6. Thomas Holden
3. Sophia Jane Holden
7. Penelope Sofiano

== Bibliography ==
- Camp, Anthony J. (2007). Royal Mistresses and Bastards: Fact and Fiction 1714–1936. London: Anthony J. Camp. ISBN 978-0-9503308-2-2. OCLC 260200087.
- Dod's Peerage, Ltd. (1917). Dod's Peerage, Baronetage, Knightage, etc. of Great Britain and Ireland for 1917. London: Simkin, Marshall, Hamilton, Kent & Co., Ltd. OCLC 37641333 – via Internet Archive.
- Duff, Ethel M. Bailey (1938). The Life Story of H.R.H. The Duke of Cambridge. London: Stanley Paul. OCLC 71881864 – via Internet Archive.
- Huberty, Michel (1981). L'Allemagne dynastique: Brunswick, Nassau, Schwarzbourg. Le Perreux-sur-Marne: Alain Giraud. ISBN 978-2-901138-03-7. OCLC 768862988.
- McNaughton, C. Arnold (1973). The Book of Kings: A Royal Genealogy. Vol. 2. London: Garnstone Press. OCLC 632582714.
- St. Aubyn, Giles (1963). The Royal George, 1819-1904: The Life of H.R.H. Prince George, Duke of Cambridge. New York City: Alfred A. Knopf. OCLC 4122129.
- Scott, Clement, ed. (1882). The Theatre. A Monthly Review of the Drama, Music, and Fine Arts. Vol. VI. London: Charles Dickens & Evans. OCLC 54311004. Archived from the original on 21 March 2019 – via Google Books.
- Selsey57 Voluntary Community WWI Project (2017). "George E A A FitzGeorge Hamilton". Selsey57 Voluntary Community WWI Project. Selsey, West Sussex. Archived from the original on 19 November 2017.
- Stock, Elliot, ed. (May 1904). "The Genealogical Magazine: A Journal of Family Heraldry & Pedigrees". Vol. 7–8. London: Elliot Stock. OCLC 173399016. Archived from the original on 21 March 2019 – via Google Books.
- Townend, Peter, ed. (1965). Burke's Genealogical and Heraldic History of the Landed Gentry. Vol. 1 (18 ed.). London: Burke's Peerage, Ltd. OCLC 670492813.
- Weir, Alison (1989). Britain's Royal Families: The Complete Genealogy. London: The Bodley Head. ISBN 978-0-370-31310-8. OCLC 1008227480.
- Winchester College (2017). "Hamilton, George Edward Archibald Augustus FitzGeorge". Winchester College at War. Winchester, Hampshire: Winchester College. Archived from the original on 19 November 2017.
