= St Peter's Church, Eaton Square =

Church in Belgravia, London

Coordinates: 51.4978°N 0.1493°W

St. Peter's Church, Eaton Square
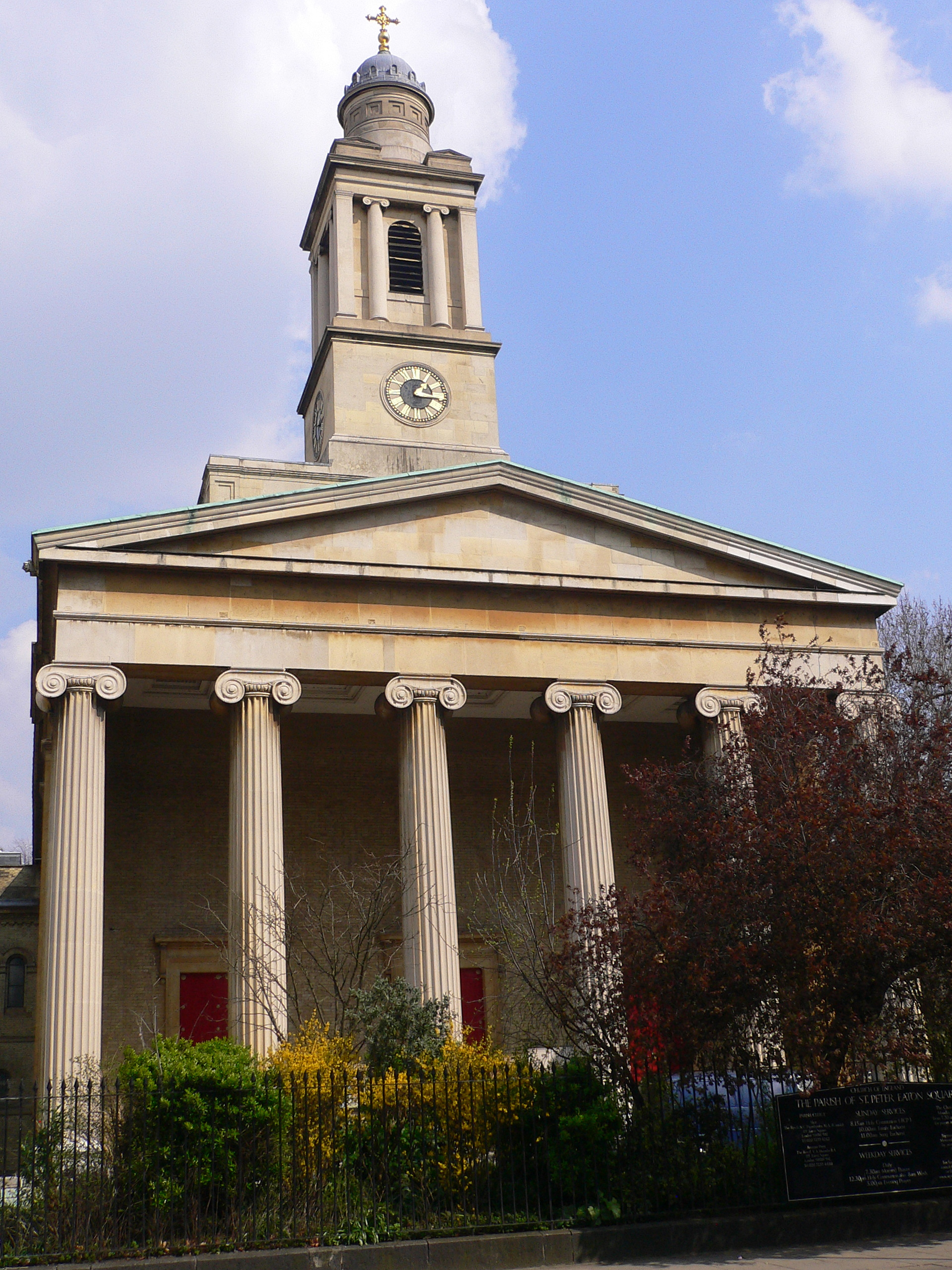
- South-west front of St Peter's
- St. Peter's Church, Eaton Square
- OS grid reference: TQ 28583 79295
- Location: Eaton Square, Belgravia, London SW1
- Country: England
- Denomination: Church of England
- Churchmanship: Inclusive Anglo Catholic
- Website: St Peter's Eaton Square

History
- Status: Parish church
- Dedication: Peter the Apostle
- Events: 1837 rebuilt after a fire 1987 gutted by fire again 1991 rebuilt again

Architecture
- Functional status: Active
- Heritage designation: Grade II* listed
- Designated: 24 February 1958
- Architect(s): Henry Hakewill (1824 design); Arthur Blomfield (1875 chancel and transepts); Braithwaite Partnership (1991 rebuilding)
- Style: Neoclassical
- Completed: 1827, 1837, 1991

Administration
- Province: Canterbury
- Diocese: London

Clergy
- Vicar: Fr Jonathan Kester

St. Peter's Church, Eaton Square, is a Church of England parish church at the east end of Eaton Square, Belgravia, London. It is a neoclassical building designed by the architect Henry Hakewill with a hexastyle portico with Ionic columns and a clock tower. On 19 October 1991 The Times newspaper wrote "St Peter’s must now rank as one of the most beautiful churches in London". It is a Grade II* listed building.

== History ==
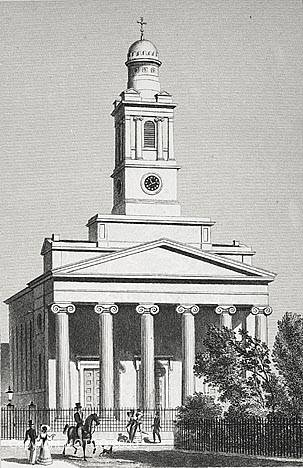
St Peter's in 1827

St Peter's was built between 1824 and 1827 during the first development of Eaton Square. The interior was, as was common at the time, a "preaching box", with galleries in three sides and the organ and choir at the west end. James Elmes called the effect "chaste and simple".

This building burnt down, and in 1837 was rebuilt from Hakewill's drawings by one of his sons. The original building was a Commissioners' church, receiving a grant from the Church Building Commission towards its cost. The full cost of the building was £22,427 (equivalent to £2,050,000 in 2025), towards which the Commission paid £5,556.

In 1875, the church was enlarged and reordered to designs by Sir Arthur Blomfield, who added a chancel at the east end and north and south transepts and "fiercely normanized" the interior. Internally Blomfield's chancel and transepts are Romanesque Revival, but externally they conform with Hakewill's neoclassical style.

From its founding St Peter's, Eaton Square, was considered in Pimlico and until at least 1878 was usually recorded as St Peter's, Pimlico. All of the parish of Christ Church, Broadway and half of that of St Andrew's Church, Ashley Place were merged into St Peter's after they were both damaged beyond repair in the Blitz, with the other half of St Andrew's parish going to St Stephen's Church, Rochester Row.

In 1951 the crypt containing some 400 burials was cleared and the remains reinterred at Brookwood Cemetery in Surrey. Choristers for the choir were provided by London Choir School until 1958 when the choir school closed.

=== Arson and rebuilding ===
On 20 October 1987 an anti-Catholic arsonist set fire to the east end, in the mistaken belief that the building was a Roman Catholic chapel. Within hours the church was engulfed. By the next day the fire was out but only the Georgian shell of the building remained. It was roofless, with most of its furnishings destroyed.

The church needed total rebuilding. The Braithwaite Partnership of architects was appointed to completely redesign the building with a new and simpler interior, and to incorporate within the site a vicarage, offices, flats for a curate, verger and music director, a meeting hall, nursery school rooms and a large playroom for the church's youth club.

Work on the new church began at Easter 1990 and was completed in 1991. It retained the grand Georgian portico but beyond that the interior is described by visitors as clean, bright and modern. The choir and organ are at the west end, as in the 1827 plan, but the fittings are thoroughly modern. The church is accessible and has disabled-accessible toilets. Behind the altar is an apse that is decorated entirely with gold mosaic. Around the side of the apse, part of the 1873 sanctuary which survived the fire can be seen, and also a side chapel now used as the vestry office, complete with stained glass.

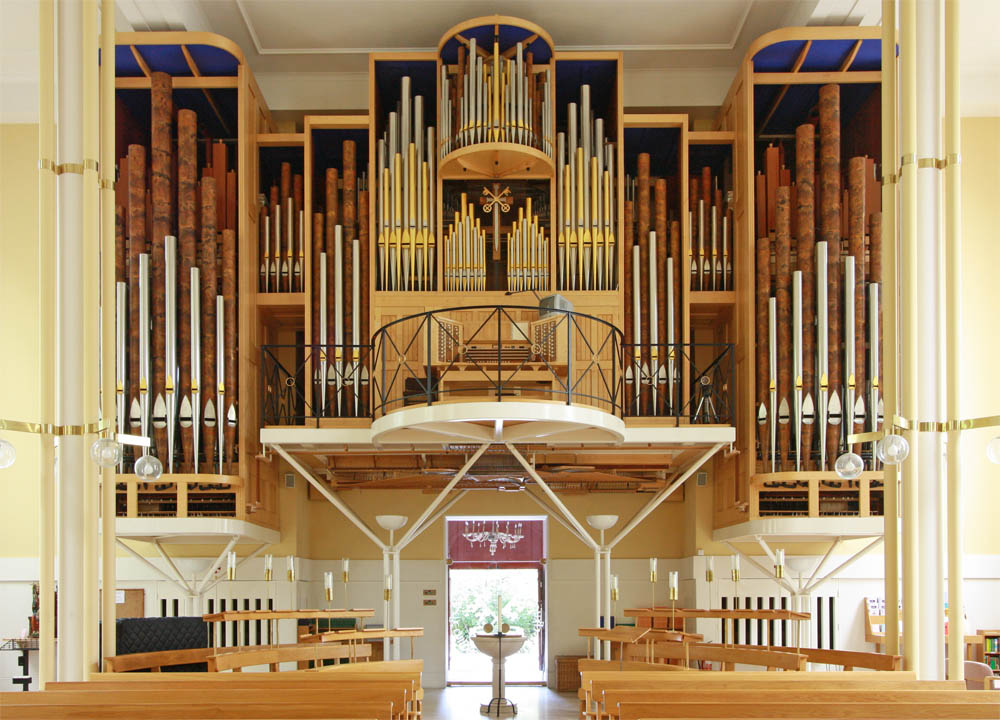
The organ inside St Peter's after the 1991 rebuilding

=== Present day ===
St Peter's stands in the inclusive Anglo-Catholic tradition of the Church of England. It holds Book of Common Prayer as well as Common Worship services.

== Notable weddings ==
- Gertrude Vernon and Sir Andrew Agnew, 9th Baronet, 15 October 1889
- Olga FitzGeorge and Charles Edward Archibald Watkin Hamilton (later to become Sir Archibald Hamilton, 5th Baronet), on 18 December 1897
- Prince Victor Duleep Singh and Lady Anne Blanche Alice of Coventry, 4 April 1898
- Edith Helen Chaplin and Charles Vane-Tempest-Stewart, Viscount Castlereagh, 28 November 1899
- Dorothea Beighton and J. A. Middleton, MC, 4 January 1921
- Margaret Campbell Geddes and Prince Ludwig of Hesse and by Rhine, 17 November 1937. The wedding had been planned for the day after but was moved forward after Prince Ludwig's family perished in the Sabena OO-AUB Ostend crash.
- Stirling Moss and Canadian heiress Katie Molson, 7 October 1957. The wedding was attended by over 500 guests.
- Lady Camilla Bingham and Michael Bloch, 12 September 1998

== See also ==
- List of Commissioners' churches in London
- Mother Cecile of Grahamstown

== Sources ==
- Pevsner, Nikolaus; Cherry, Bridget (revision) (1973) [1951]. London. The Buildings of England. Vol. 1 The Cities of London and Westminster (3rd ed.). Harmondsworth: Penguin Books. pp. 498–499. ISBN 0-14-071011-6.
- Port, MH (2006). 600 New Churches: The Church Building Commission 1818–1856 (2nd ed.). Reading: Spire Books. p. 328. ISBN 978-1-904965-08-4.
