= Adolphus FitzGeorge =

English military officer (1846–1922)

Rear-Admiral Sir Adolphus FitzGeorge KCVO
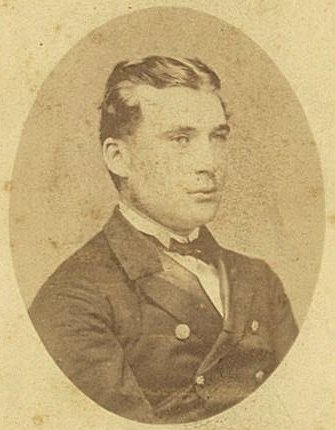
- Lieutenant FitzGeorge, of HMS Galatea, 1868
- Born: 30 January 1846; Buckingham Palace, London, England
- Died: 17 December 1922 (aged 76); London, England
- Spouses: Sophia Jane Holden (m. 1875; died 1920) Marguerite Watson (m. 1920)
- Relatives: Prince George, Duke of Cambridge (father); Sarah Fairbrother (mother); Olga FitzGeorge (daughter); George FitzGeorge Hamilton (grandson)
- Military career
- Allegiance: United Kingdom
- Branch: Royal Navy
- Service years: 1859–1893
- Commands: HMS Jumna; HMS Salamis; HMS Dasher; HMS Rapid
- Awards: Knight Commander of the Royal Victorian Order

Rear-Admiral Sir Adolphus Augustus Frederick FitzGeorge KCVO (30 January 1846 – 17 December 1922) was a senior officer of the Royal Navy.

== Biography ==
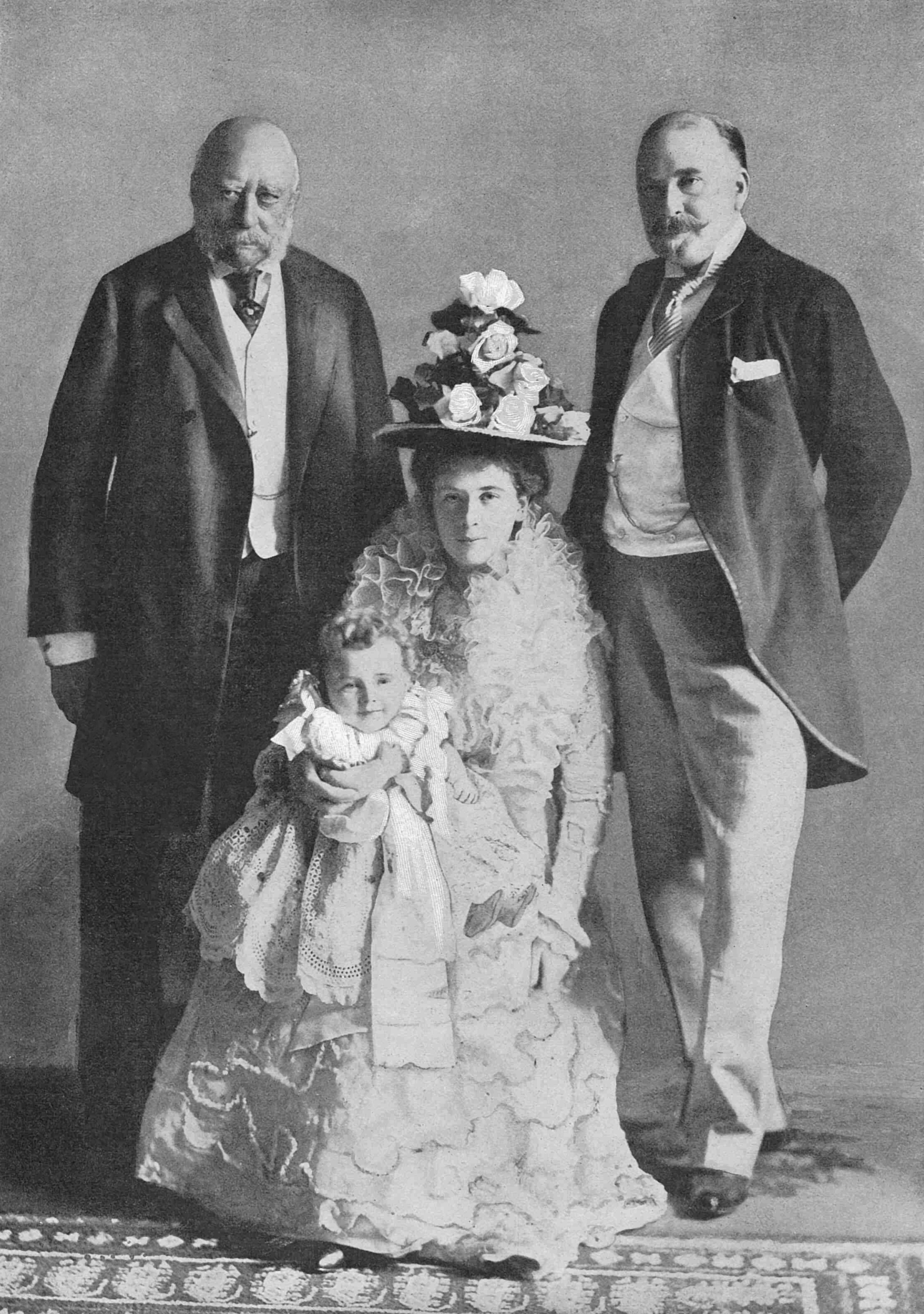
FitzGeorge (right) with his father Prince George, Duke of Cambridge, daughter Olga, and grandson George FitzGeorge Hamilton, 1900.

Adolphus FitzGeorge was born on 30 January 1846, the second illegitimate son of Prince George, Duke of Cambridge, and the actress Sarah Fairbrother. His parents subsequently went through a form of marriage in contravention of the Royal Marriages Act 1772 when his mother was pregnant with his youngest brother. As the marriage was void, he and his brothers, George and Augustus, were illegitimate and therefore did not hold royal titles and were ineligible to succeed to the Dukedom of Cambridge.

Adolphus entered the Royal Navy in March 1859. He became sub-lieutenant in 1865, and a lieutenant in the following year. In June 1867, he joined the Galatea, screw frigate, commanded by Captain, the Duke of Edinburgh, and in March 1872, was appointed Flag Lieutenant to Admiral Sir Rodney Mundy, Commander-in-Chief, Portsmouth. On 30 November 1872, he was promoted to commander. Following a period at the Royal Naval College, he became Inspecting Officer of Coastguard at Scarborough in February 1874, and in September of the next year, was given command of the sloop Rapid in the Mediterranean. Other commands he held were those of the Dasher, paddle gun-vessel, stationed off the Channel Islands; and the Salamis, dispatch vessel, in the Channel Squadron, from the latter of which he was promoted captain on 14 October 1881. In March 1885, he became captain of the troopship Jumna, in the transport service to India, and his two years or more in this command marked the limit of his active naval employment. He retired on 1 January 1893, and was advanced to rear admiral on the retired list on 20 October 1896. On leaving the Navy, he received the appointment of Deputy Ranger of Richmond Park. For many years, he acted as equerry to his father, and in 1904, the year in which the Duke died, he was gazetted a Knight Commander of the Royal Victorian Order.

Adolphus married, on 21 September 1875 in Kingston upon Hull, Sophia Jane Holden (2 April 1857 – 3 February 1920), the daughter of Mr. Thomas Holden, of Winstead Hall, Hull, by whom he had one daughter, Olga FitzGeorge. Following the death of the first Lady FitzGeorge, the Admiral married, on 28 October 1920 in London, Marguerite Beatrice Daisy Watson (14 April 1863 – 26 February 1934), daughter of John Watson, of Waresley Court, Hartlebury, Worcestershire.

Sir Adolphus died on 17 December 1922 at his residence, 20 Eccleston Square, London.

== Issue ==
Name	Birth	Death	Notes
Olga Mary Adelaide FitzGeorge	11 June 1877	15 October 1928	married firstly, 1897, Mr (later Sir) C.E. Archibald Hamilton (divorced 1902); married secondly, in 1905, Robert Charlton Lane. Issue from both marriages (including Second Lieutenant George FitzGeorge Hamilton).

== Ancestry ==
Ancestors of Adolphus FitzGeorge

16. Frederick, Prince of Wales
8. George III of the United Kingdom
17. Princess Augusta of Saxe-Gotha
4. Prince Adolphus, Duke of Cambridge
18. Duke Charles Louis Frederick of Mecklenburg
9. Charlotte of Mecklenburg-Strelitz
19. Princess Elisabeth Albertine of Saxe-Hildburghausen
2. Prince George, Duke of Cambridge
20. Frederick II, Landgrave of Hesse-Kassel
10. Prince Frederick of Hesse-Kassel
21. Princess Mary of Great Britain
5. Princess Augusta of Hesse-Kassel
22. Charles William, Prince of Nassau-Usingen
11. Princess Caroline of Nassau-Usingen
23. Countess Caroline Felizitas of Leiningen-Dagsburg
1. Adolphus FitzGeorge
6. John Fairbrother
3. Sarah Fairbrother
7. Mary Tucker
