= Sugar caster =

Household item and part of tableware

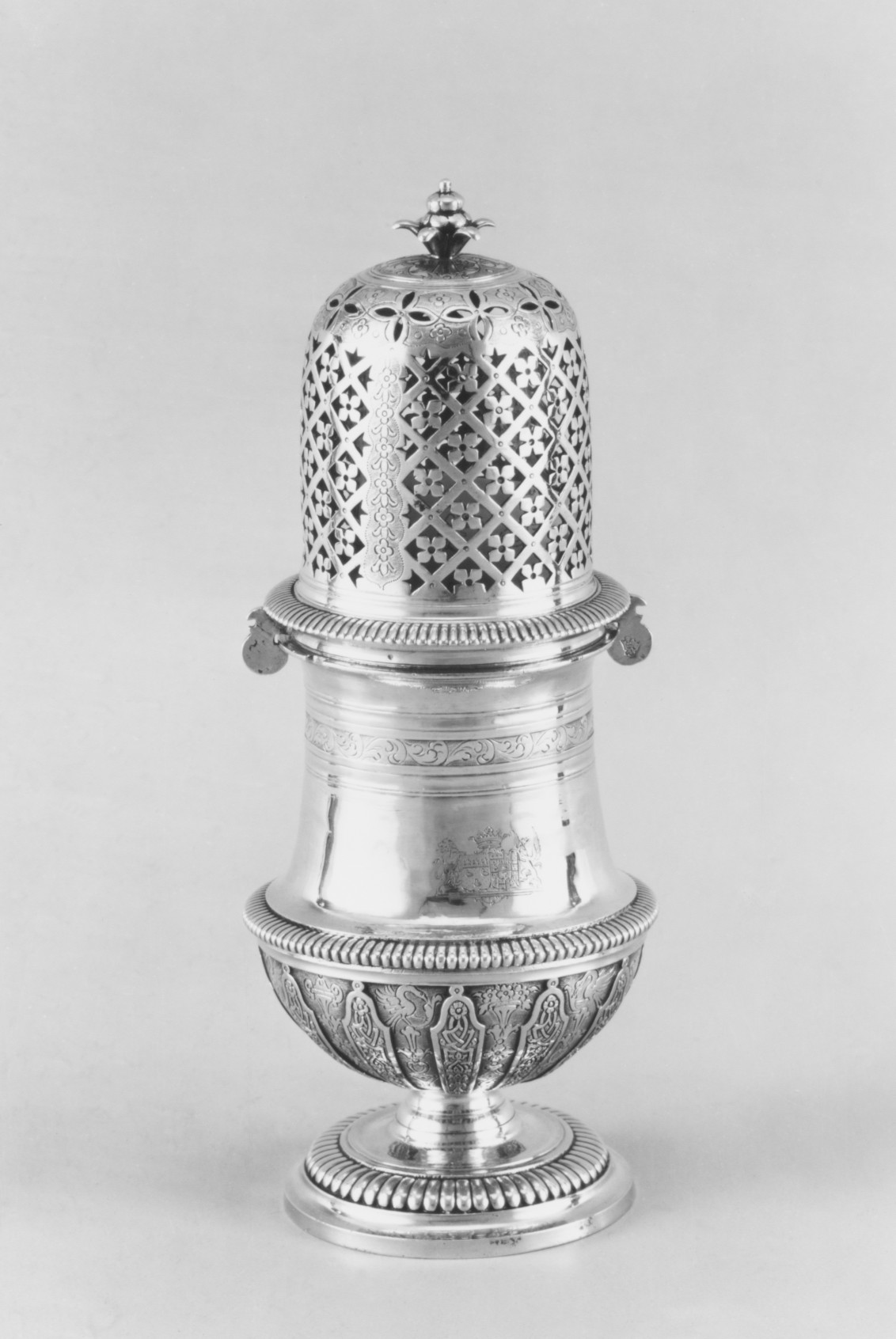
Sugar caster, silver, made by David André, 1709-1710, in Paris, France

A sugar caster is a small container, with a perforated top, larger than a salt shaker but similar in form. The sugar caster was part of a set of vessels, and a rack to hold them used to contain spices and condiments on the dining table. The set would have a salt shaker, a pepper shaker, a vinegar cruet, an oil cruet, a sugar shaker, and a mayonnaise jar with spoon. The word is first attested to in 1676.

The set was used by the affluent and wealthy, to cast or sprinkle, pepper, sugar, salt, or the like, in the form of powder. The name comes from the act of casting the contents when using the set. The name was extended to other vessels used to contain condiments at table, and eventually to the type of sugar with crystal size that could easily be cast (‘caster sugar’).

Until well into the 19th century, sugar came in solid blocks called sugar loaves, which needed to be broken into smaller pieces to use. Only the wealthy could afford the effort needed to produce the small granules needed for a sugar caster.

A caster may also be a pierced spoon for sprinkling sugar, with no integral container, to be used with a sugar-bowl (or at least, with a bowl of sugar). Such casters are usually silver or plate.
