= Warlincourt-lès-Pas =

- Commune
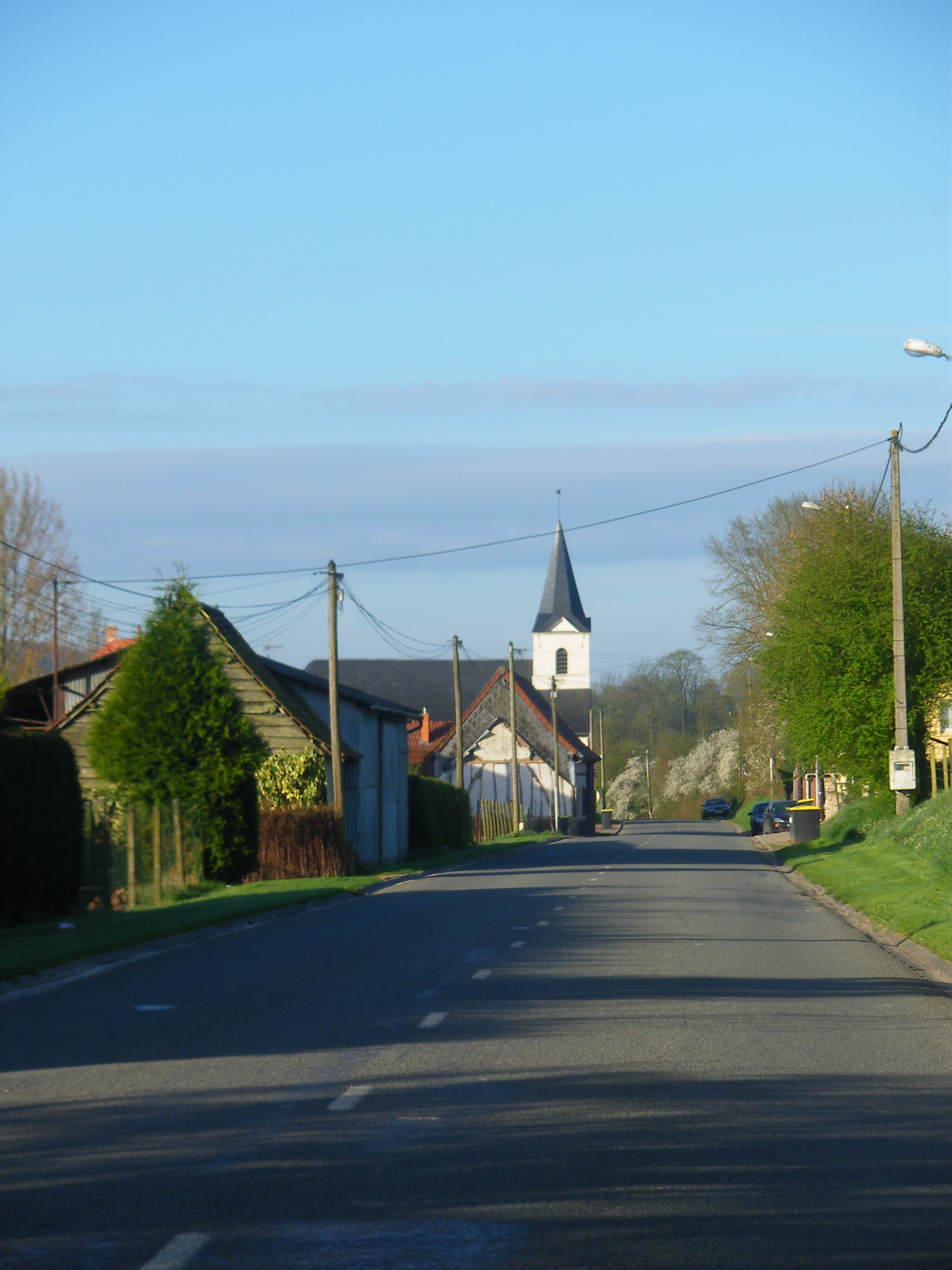
- The main road of Warlincourt-lès-Pas

- Coat of arms
- Location of Warlincourt-lès-Pas
- Location within France Location within Hauts-de-France
- Coordinates: 50°10′28″N 2°30′22″E
- Country: France
- Region: Hauts-de-France
- Department: Pas-de-Calais
- Arrondissement: Arras
- Canton: Avesnes-le-Comte
- Intercommunality: Campagnes de l'Artois

Government
  - Mayor (2020–2026): Philippe Vanderbeken
- Area^{1}: 5.19 km^{2} (2.00 sq mi)
- Elevation: 161 m (528 ft)
- Highest elevation: 171 m (561 ft)
- Lowest elevation: 105 m (344 ft)
- Population (2023): 177
  - Density: 34.1/km^{2} (88.3/sq mi)
- Time zone: UTC+01:00 (CET)
  - Summer (DST): UTC+02:00 (CEST)
- INSEE/Postal code: 62877 /62760
- ^{1} French Land Register data, which excludes lakes, ponds, glaciers > 1 km^{2} (0.386 sq mi or 247 acres) and river estuaries.

Warlincourt-lès-Pas (French pronunciation: [waʁlɛ̃kuʁ lɛ pa], literally Warlincourt near Pas) is a commune in the Pas-de-Calais department in the Hauts-de-France region of France about 16 miles (26 km) southwest of Arras.

== History ==
The commune was awarded the Croix de Guerre on 23 September 1920.

== Population ==
Historical population
Year	Pop.	±% p.a.
1968	162	—
1975	154	−0.72%
1982	144	−0.95%
1990	136	−0.71%
1999	153	+1.32%
2007	147	−0.50%
2012	180	+4.13%
2017	174	−0.68%
2023	177	+0.29%
Source: INSEE

== See also ==
- Communes of the Pas-de-Calais department
