= Rosa Baring =

British aristocrat

- Born: Rosa Frederica Baring; 9 March 1854; West Tytherley, Hampshire, England
- Died: 10 March 1927 (aged 73); Cannes, France
- Spouses: Frank Wigsell Arkwright (m. 1878; div. 1885) George William Adolphus FitzGeorge (m. 1885; died 1907)
- Children: 5, including Vera Bate Lombardi
- Relatives: Bridget Bate Tichenor (granddaughter); Victor FitzGeorge-Balfour (grandson)

Rosa Frederica FitzGeorge (née Baring, formerly Arkwright; 9 March 1854 – 10 March 1927) was an English socialite.

== Origin ==
Rosa was born on 9 March 1854 at Norman Court in West Tytherley, Hampshire, England. She was the second daughter of William Henry Baring, JP and Elizabeth Hammersley. Her elder brother, Francis Charles Baring, married Isabella Augusta Schuster (a granddaughter of the 5th Earl of Orkney), and her younger brother, William Bingham Baring, married Georgina Margaret Campbell (daughter of Charles Hallyburton Campbell).

Her paternal grandparents were William Baring (a younger son of the famous Sir Francis Baring of the Barings Bank) and Frances (née Poulett-Thomson) Baring. Her maternal grandparents were Charles Hammersley and Emily (née Poulett-Thomson) Hammersley, and her uncle was Thomas Weguelin, partner of Thomson, Bonar, and Company of London, Director and Governor of the Bank of England. Her grandmothers were sisters, both being daughters of London merchant John Buncombe Poulett-Thomson of Waverley Abbey House, and sisters to Charles Poulett Thomson, 1st Baron Sydenham.

== Personal life ==
Rosa married twice and, reportedly, was not friendly with the families of either of her two husbands.

=== First marriage ===
On 29 August 1878, she was married to Capt. Frank Wigsell Arkwright at Sanderstead, Surrey Court, England. He was a son of Robert Wigram Arkwright (great-grandson of Sir Richard Arkwright, of Willersley Castle) and Sophia Julia (née Greig) Arkwright. They had two children:

- Esmé Francis Wigsell Arkwright (1882–1934), who married Audrey Violet Hatfeild Harter, daughter of James Francis Hatfield Harter, in 1909. They divorced. He married Violet Eveleen (née Sutton), former wife of Maj.-Gen. Albemarle Cator and daughter of Capt. Francis Richard Hugh Seymour Sutton and Lady Susan Elizabeth Lascelles (a daughter of the 4th Earl of Harewood), in 1920.
- Vera Nina Arkwright (1883–1948), who, following her parents' divorce, grew up with her Baring grandparents though she is said to have become the surrogate god child of Margaret Cambridge, Marchioness of Cambridge, wife of Prince Adolphus, Duke of Teck. Vera married Frederick Blantford Bate in 1916. They divorced in 1929, and that same year she married Italian cavalry officer Alberto Lombardi.

Rosa and Frank divorced in 1885.

=== Second marriage ===
She married secondly on 25 November 1885 to Col. George William Adolphus FitzGeorge, in Paris. The eldest of the three sons of Prince George, Duke of Cambridge and his mistress Louisa Fairbrother, he was a grandson of King George III. According to the Marquise de Fontenoy her marriage to Col. FitzGeorge "gave great offense" to his father, Prince George. George and Rosa were the parents of:

- Mabel Iris FitzGeorge (1886–1976), who married Robert Shekelton Balfour in 1912. After his death in 1943, she married Prince Vladimir Galitzine, in 1945.
- George Daphne FitzGeorge (1889–1954), who married to Sir George Foster Earle, in 1915. They divorced in 1926.
- George William Frederick FitzGeorge (1892–1960), who married Esther Melina Vignon in 1915. They divorced in 1927 and he married France Bellanger, daughter of Robert Bellenger, in 1934. They divorced in 1957.

She made "plenty of capital of the royal blood in the veins of her husband" and as the daughter-in-law of the Duke of Cambridge, Rosa flourished in New York and Chicago as "Lady FitzGeorge" using the title in pursuit of wealthy American families to find a husband for her daughter Vera.

George died on 2 September 1907.

=== Death ===
Rosa FitzGeorge died on 10 March 1927 in Cannes, France.

=== Descendants ===
Through her daughter Vera, she was a grandmother to Bridget Bate Tichenor, a Magic Realist painter who lived in Mexico from 1956 to 1990.

Through her daughter Iris, she was a grandmother to Gen. Victor FitzGeorge-Balfour, the UK Military Representative to NATO.
