= Sir Archibald Hamilton, 5th Baronet =

British convert to Islam

Sir Charles Edward Archibald Watkin Hamilton, 5th and 3rd Baronet (10 December 1876 – 18 March 1939), known from 1923 as Sir Abdullah Hamilton, was a British aristocrat and convert to Islam.

He was the son of Sir Edward Archibald Hamilton, 4th Baronet of Trebishun, Breconshire and 2nd Baronet of Marlborough House, Hampshire (1843–1915) and his wife Mary Elizabeth Gill. He inherited both baronetcies upon the death of his father in 1915. He was also a descendant of William Hamilton, one of the five Kentish Petitioners of 1701, great-grandson of Admiral Sir Edward Joseph Hamilton, 1st Baronet Hamilton of Marlborough House, direct descendant of the Duke of Abercorn and also Lord Hamilton who married Princess Mary Stewart of Scotland, daughter of James II of Scotland. He served as a Lieutenant in the Royal Defence Corps and was at one time President of the Selsey (Sussex) Conservative Association, and also later a member of Sir Oswald Mosley's British Union of Fascists for a brief period during the 1930s.

== Marriages and children ==
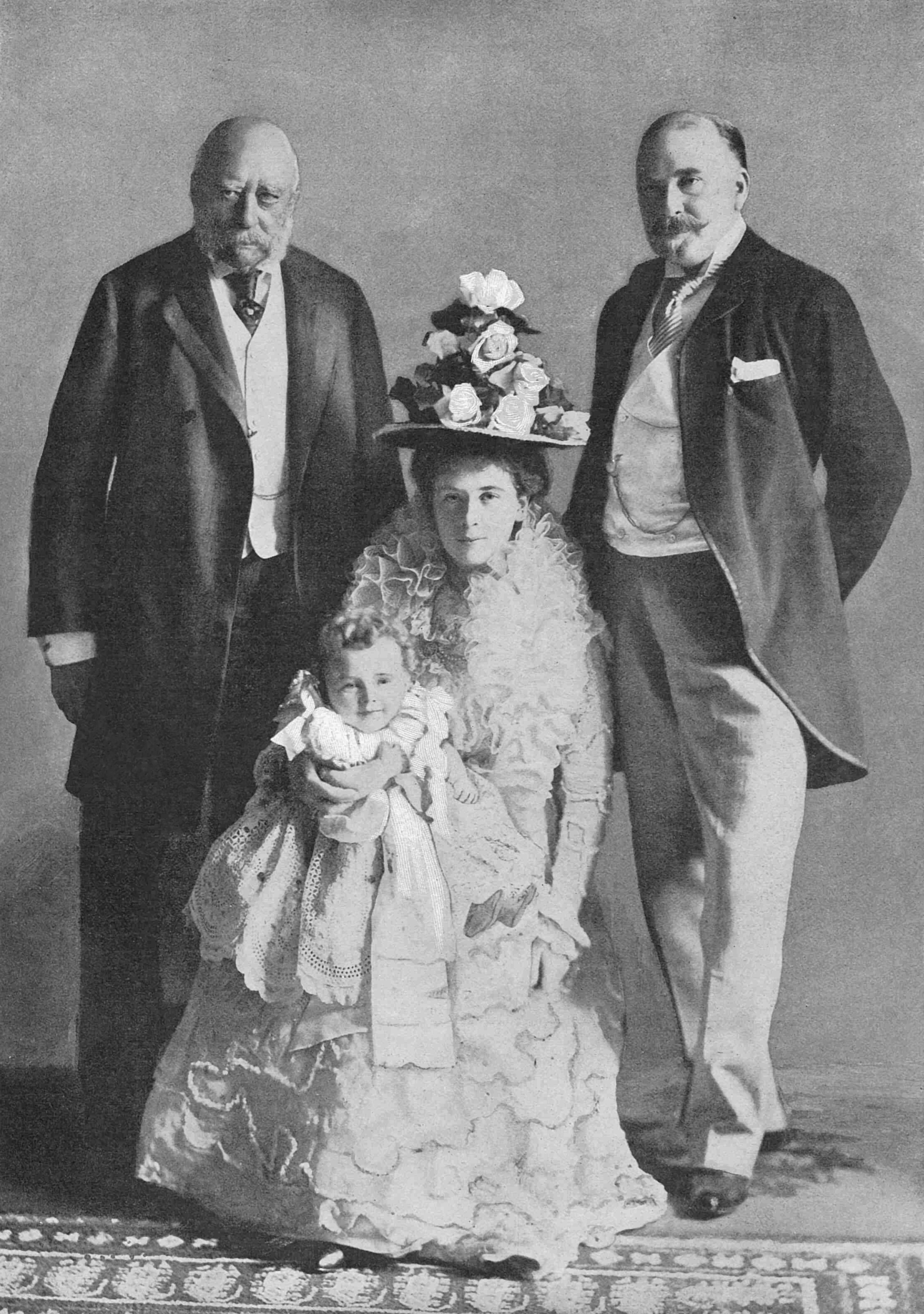
Hamilton's son George FitzGeorge Hamilton seated on the lap of his wife Olga FitzGeorge (center) with her grandfather Prince George, Duke of Cambridge (left) and her father Sir Adolphus FitzGeorge (right) in 1900.

He was married three times and twice divorced.

=== Olga FitzGeorge ===
Sir Archibald married Olga Mary Adelaide FitzGeorge, daughter of Rear-Admiral Sir Adolphus FitzGeorge KCVO and Sophia Jane Holden, granddaughter of the Duke of Cambridge and first cousin to Queen Victoria on 18 December 1897 in London. The marriage resulted in two children, George Edward Archibald Augustus FitzGeorge Hamilton (30 December 1898 – 18 May 1918) whose baptism was attended by Queen Mary and King George V who along with the Duke of Cambridge were pledged to be his godparents. He was killed in action in May 1918. They had one unnamed daughter (b. 5 May 1902 – d. 5 May 1902). They divorced in 1902.

=== Algorta Child ===
In November 1906, he married secondly Algorta Marjory Blanche Child, the daughter of George Child, of Widford, Hertfordshire, but she divorced him in 1915.

=== Lilian Austen ===
In 1927, Sir Archibald married Lilian Maud (b. 1880 – d. 1964), daughter of William Austen, of Sydenham, Kent. Lady Hamilton also converted to Islam, taking the name Miriam.

== Conversion to Islam ==
Sir Archibald converted to Islam on 20 December 1923. He noted that "...the beauty and the simple purity of Islam have always appealed to me. I could never, though born and brought up as a Christian, believe in the dogmatic aspect of the Church... I found that both the Church of Rome and the Church of England were of no real use to me" and that having converted to Islam he felt "a better and truer man".

== Death ==
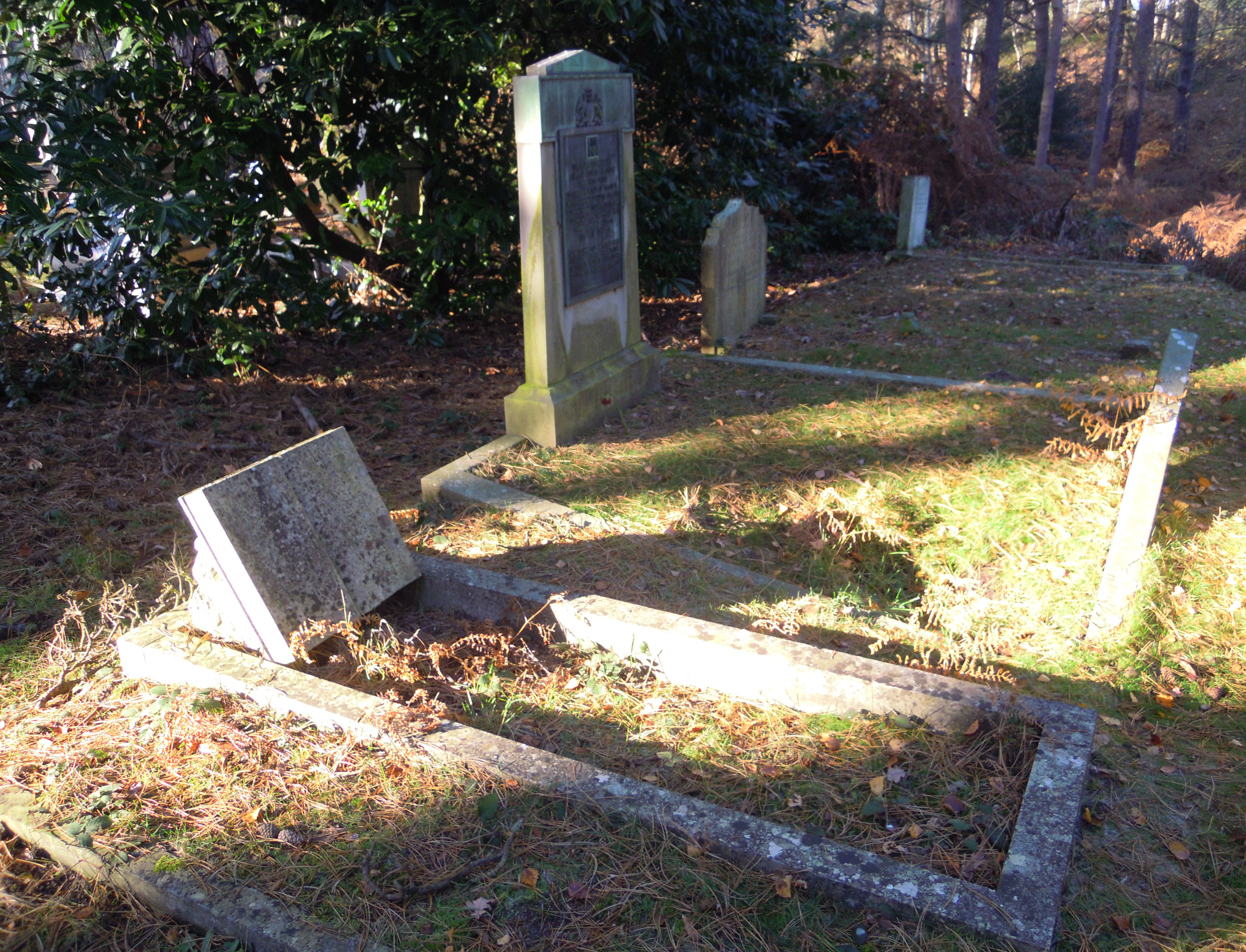
Hamilton's grave (foreground) at Brookwood Cemetery. The grave of Rowland Allanson-Winn behind

He died on 18 March 1939 at the age of 62, and is buried at the Brookwood Cemetery alongside Rowland Allanson-Winn, 5th Baron Headley, they having been "great friends in life" and "close comrades-in-arms in the cause of Islam".

== See also ==
- Henry Stanley, 3rd Baron Stanley of Alderley
- Marmaduke Pickthall
- William Abdullah Quilliam
- Faris Glubb
- Timothy Winter

Baronetage of Great Britain
Preceded by Edward Archibald Hamilton	Baronet (of Trebinshun); 1915–1939	Succeeded by Thomas Sydney Percival Hamilton
Baronetage of the United Kingdom
Preceded by Edward Archibald Hamilton	Baronet (of Marlborough House); 1915–1939	Succeeded by Thomas Sydney Percival Hamilton
