= Victor FitzGeorge-Balfour =

General Sir Victor FitzGeorge-Balfour KCB CBE DSO MC DL
- Born: 15 September 1913; Knightsbridge, London, England
- Died: 28 December 1994 (aged 81); West Chiltington, West Sussex, England
- Education: King's College, Cambridge
- Spouse: Mary Christian (m. 1943)
- Military career
- Allegiance: United Kingdom
- Branch: British Army
- Service years: 1934–1974
- Rank: General
- Unit: Coldstream Guards
- Commands: Vice Chief of the General Staff (1968–1970); 1st Guards Brigade (1958–1960); 2nd Battalion, Coldstream Guards (1948–1950)
- Conflicts: Arab revolt in Palestine; Second World War; Malayan Emergency; Cyprus Emergency
- Awards: Knight Commander of the Order of the Bath; Commander of the Order of the British Empire; Companion of the Distinguished Service Order; Military Cross; Mentioned in Despatches (3); Commander of the Order of Orange-Nassau (Netherlands)

General Sir Robert George Victor FitzGeorge-Balfour, KCB, CBE, DSO, MC, DL (15 September 1913 – 28 December 1994) was a senior officer in the British Army.

== Early life ==
Robert George Victor FitzGeorge-Balfour was born on 15 September 1913 at Knightsbridge, London. He was the son of Robert Shekelton Balfour and Mabel Iris FitzGeorge. After his father's death in 1942, his mother married, in 1945, Russian émigré, Prince Vladimir Galitzine, former aide-de-camp to Grand Duke Nikolai Nikolaevich, commander in chief of the Imperial Russian Army.

Through his maternal grandfather, Colonel George FitzGeorge, he was a direct descendant from King George III through the King's grandson, Prince George, Duke of Cambridge, and his mistress Sarah Fairbrother. In 1922, his name was legally changed to Victor FitzGeorge-Balfour by deed poll.

FitzGeorge-Balfour was educated at Eton College and at King's College, Cambridge.

== Military career ==
FitzGeorge-Balfour was commissioned a second lieutenant in the Coldstream Guards' Supplementary Reserve of Officers on 25 June 1932. He transferred to the regular Coldstream Guards on 1 February 1934, and was promoted to lieutenant on 25 June 1935. He served in Palestine during the Arab revolt, for which he was awarded the Military Cross in 1939.

FitzGeorge-Balfour fought in the Second World War, serving in North Africa, Sicily and North-West Europe as a staff officer with XXX Corps. By March 1941, he was a temporary captain. He was made a substantive captain on 1 February 1942, and was a temporary major by October 1943. That same month, he was appointed Member of the Order of the British Empire "in recognition of gallant and distinguished services in the Middle East". He served on the general staff of VIII Corps in 1944 and, by 1945, he was a temporary brigadier. He ended the war as a war substantive lieutenant colonel, and was advanced to Commander of the Order of the British Empire on 11 October 1945 "in recognition of gallant and distinguished services in North-West Europe". He had been Mentioned in Despatches twice during the war: on 1 April 1941, "for distinguished services in the Middle East during the period August 1939 to November 1940", and on 23 March 1944 "in recognition of gallant and distinguished services in Sicily".

Having reverted to the rank of captain following the end of the war, FitzGeorge-Balfour was promoted to major on 1 February 1947. In 1948, he was appointed commanding officer of the 2nd Battalion, Coldstream Guards in Malaya. For his command of the battalion during the Malayan Emergency, he was Mentioned in Despatches on 13 December 1949 and appointed a Companion of the Distinguished Service Order on 18 September 1950.

FitzGeorge-Balfour was promoted to colonel on 15 September 1954 with seniority from 17 June. The following year, he attended the Imperial Defence College. He was made commander of the First Brigade of Guards in 1958, deputy director of staff duties in 1960, and chief of staff at Southern Command in 1962. He went on to be director of military operations in 1964, senior army instructor at the Imperial Defence College in 1967 and vice chief of the general staff in 1968. He was appointed a Knight Commander of the Order of the Bath that same year. His last appointment was as UK Military Representative to NATO before he retired in 1974.

== Later life ==
FitzGeorge-Balfour was chairman of the National Fund for Research into Crippling Diseases from 1975 to 1989. He was appointed colonel commandant of The Honourable Artillery Company, a Territorial Army unit, on 2 August 1976. His tenure expired on 1 September 1984, when he was succeeded by General Sir Richard Trant. He held the office of Deputy Lieutenant (DL) of West Sussex in 1977.

== Personal life ==
FitzGeorge-Balfour married Mary Diana Christian (1914–1994), daughter of Adm. Arthur Christian and Geraldine Diana Monsell, at the Chapel Royal of St. James's Palace on 4 December 1943. Together they had two children:

- Diana Mary Christian FitzGeorge-Balfour (b. 1946)
- Robert Victor FitzGeorge-Balfour (b. 1951), an investment banker who married Patricia Anne Christiana Rowntree, a daughter of Charles William Rowntree, in 1976.

FitzGeorge-Balfour died on 28 December 1994 at West Chiltington, West Sussex. He was buried on 4 January 1995 at Findon Crematorium, Worthing, West Sussex.

== Ancestry ==
Ancestors of Victor FitzGeorge-Balfour

8. Robert Balfour
4. Robert Balfour
9. Isabella Edmond
2. Robert Balfour
10. Robert Shekleton
5. Annie Shekelton
11. Anne Furlong
1. Victor FitzGeorge-Balfour
12. Prince George, Duke of Cambridge
6. George FitzGeorge
13. Sarah Fairbrother
3. Mabel Iris FitzGeorge
14. William Henry Baring
7. Rosa Frederica Baring
15. Elizabeth Hammersley

Military offices
Preceded by Sir Desmond Fitzpatrick	Vice Chief of the General Staff; 1968–1970	Succeeded by Sir Cecil Blacker
Preceded by Sir David Lee	UK Military Representative to NATO; 1971–1973	Succeeded by Sir Rae McKaig
Preceded by Sir Rodney Moore	Colonel Commandant and President, Honourable Artillery Company; 1976–1984	Succeeded by Sir Richard Trant
