= Saulty =

- Commune
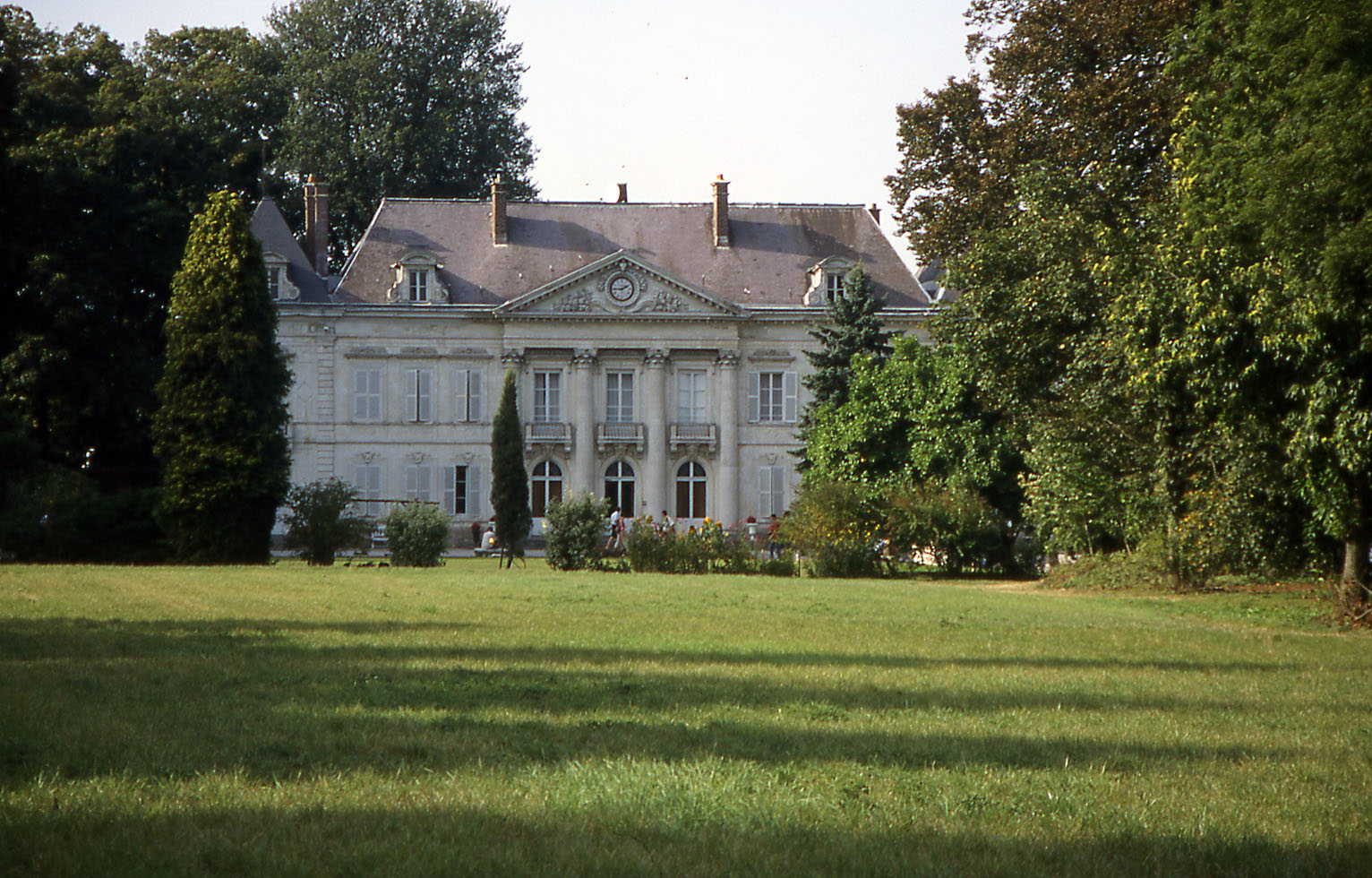
- Chateau of Saulty

- Coat of arms
- Location of Saulty
- Location within France Location within Hauts-de-France
- Coordinates: 50°12′48″N 2°31′53″E
- Country: France
- Region: Hauts-de-France
- Department: Pas-de-Calais
- Arrondissement: Arras
- Canton: Avesnes-le-Comte
- Intercommunality: CC Campagnes de l'Artois

Government
  - Mayor (2020–2026): Roland Descamps
- Area^{1}: 12.75 km^{2} (4.92 sq mi)
- Elevation: 173 m (568 ft)
- Highest elevation: 178 m (584 ft)
- Lowest elevation: 140 m (460 ft)
- Population (2023): 750
  - Density: 59/km^{2} (150/sq mi)
- Time zone: UTC+01:00 (CET)
  - Summer (DST): UTC+02:00 (CEST)
- INSEE/Postal code: 62784 /62158
- ^{1} French Land Register data, which excludes lakes, ponds, glaciers > 1 km^{2} (0.386 sq mi or 247 acres) and river estuaries.

Saulty (French pronunciation: [solti]; Picard: Souty) is a commune in the Pas-de-Calais department in the Hauts-de-France region of France 13 miles (21 km) southwest of Arras.

== Population ==
Historical population
Year	Pop.	±% p.a.
1968	731	—
1975	684	−0.94%
1982	648	−0.77%
1990	666	+0.34%
1999	625	−0.70%
2007	689	+1.23%
2012	737	+1.36%
2017	765	+0.75%
2023	750	−0.33%
Source: INSEE

== See also ==
- Communes of the Pas-de-Calais department
