= George FitzGeorge =

British military officer (1843–1907)

- Born: 24 August 1843; London, England
- Died: 2 September 1907 (aged 64); Lucerne, Switzerland
- Spouse: Rosa Frederica Baring (m. 1885)
- Relatives: Prince George, Duke of Cambridge (father); Sarah Fairbrother (mother)
- Military career
- Allegiance: United Kingdom
- Branch: British Army
- Rank: Colonel
- Unit: 20th Hussars
- Conflicts: Anglo-Egyptian War • Battle of Tel el-Kebir
- Awards: Mentioned in Despatches; Order of Osmanieh, Fourth Class (Ottoman Empire)

Colonel George William Adolphus FitzGeorge (24 August 1843 – 2 September 1907) was a British soldier and a great-grandson of King George III of the United Kingdom.

== Early life ==
Colonel FitzGeorge was born on 24 August 1843 in London. He was the eldest of the three illegitimate sons of the 2nd Duke of Cambridge and Louisa Fairbrother (the other sons were Admiral Sir Adolphus FitzGeorge and Colonel Sir Augustus FitzGeorge). His parents subsequently went through a form of marriage in contravention of the Royal Marriages Act 1772, when his mother was pregnant with his youngest brother. Neither he nor his brothers, Adolphus FitzGeorge and Augustus FitzGeorge, held royal titles, and were ineligible to succeed to the Dukedom of Cambridge.

Through his father, he was a great-grandson of King George III of the United Kingdom and first cousin to Queen Mary. Through his mother, he was a grandson of Mary Tucker, whose maiden name may have been Phillips, and John Fairbrother, a servant in Westminster.

== Career ==
In due course, following the profession of his father, he purchased a commission in the 20th Hussars.

When the Egyptian Campaign of 1882 was undertaken he went out to Egypt as a Major on special service and was attached to the personal staff of General Sir Garnet Wolseley. He was present at the battle of Tel-el-Kebir, and brought home the despatches. His services in the campaign were mentioned in despatches, and he was awarded with the brevet of lieutenant colonel, the medal with clasp, the Fourth Class of the Osmanieh, and the Khedive's Star. Wolseley described him as a “horrid snob and … quite useless.”

He retired from the Army in 1895.

In 1887, he was the owner of the Sunday Times. At the request of Queen Victoria he sold the paper to Alice Ann Cornwell, who was an Australian gold mine owner.

== Personal life ==
On 25 November 1885, FitzGeorge married Rosa Frederica Baring (1854–1927) in Paris. Rosa, a descendant of Sir Francis Baring of the Baring banking family, was the second daughter of William Henry Baring J.P. of Norman Court, Hants. Together, Rosa and George were the parents of three children:

- Mabel Iris FitzGeorge (1886–1976), who married Robert Balfour in 1912 and had issue (including Victor FitzGeorge-Balfour). She married secondly, to Prince Vladimir Galitzine, in 1945.
- George Daphné FitzGeorge (1889–1954), who married Sir George Foster Earle in 1915. They divorced in 1926.
- Commander George William Frederick FitzGeorge (1892–1960), who married Esther Melina Vignon in 1915. They divorced in 1927, and he married secondly to France Bellanger in 1934. They divorced in 1957.

Colonel FitzGeorge died at the Eden-house Hotel, Lucerne on 2 September 1907 after lying ill for some weeks.

=== Arms ===
The arms of the Fitzgeorge family were: argent, on a cross between four roses gules, a sword in pale, point upwards, proper, pommel and hilt or, on a chief arched of the second, a baton fesswise.

== Ancestry ==
Ancestors of George FitzGeorge

16. Frederick, Prince of Wales
8. George III of the United Kingdom
17. Princess Augusta of Saxe-Gotha
4. Prince Adolphus, Duke of Cambridge
18. Duke Charles Louis Frederick of Mecklenburg
9. Charlotte of Mecklenburg-Strelitz
19. Princess Elisabeth Albertine of Saxe-Hildburghausen
2. Prince George, Duke of Cambridge
20. Frederick II, Landgrave of Hesse-Kassel
10. Prince Frederick of Hesse-Kassel
21. Princess Mary of Great Britain
5. Princess Augusta of Hesse-Kassel
22. Charles William, Prince of Nassau-Usingen
11. Princess Caroline of Nassau-Usingen
23. Countess Caroline Felizitas of Leiningen-Dagsburg
1. George FitzGeorge
6. John Fairbrother
3. Sarah Fairbrother
7. Mary Tucker
