= Sarah Fairbrother =

British actress (1814–1890)

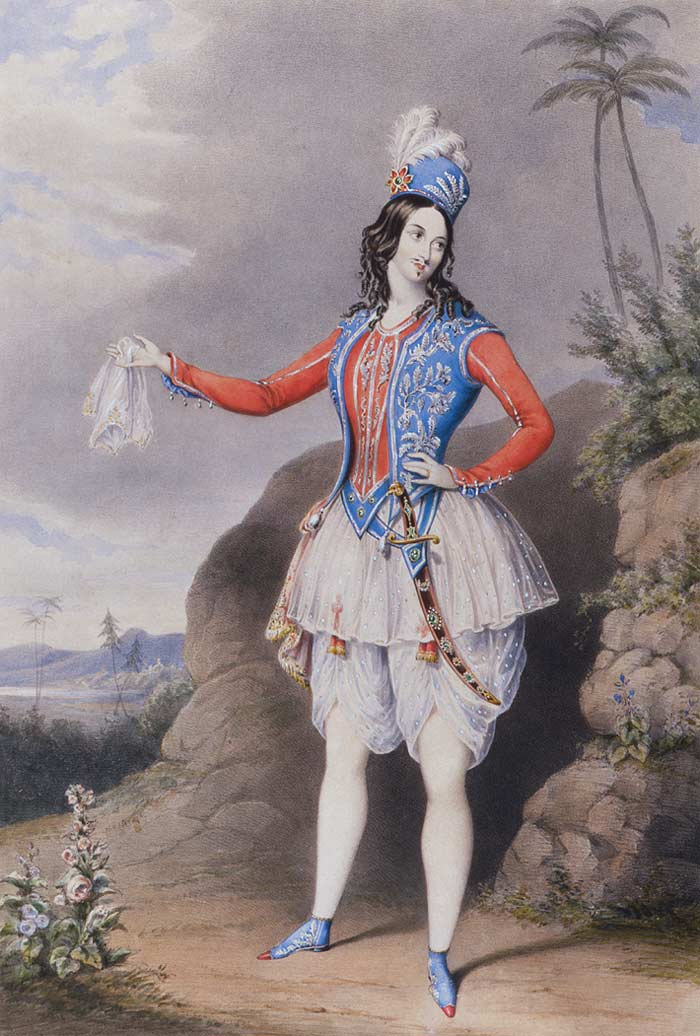
- Fairbrother as Abdullah in Open Sesame (or as Alladin in The Forty Thieves), 1844
- Born: 31 October 1814; James Street, Westminster, London
- Died: 12 January 1890 (aged 75); 6 Queen Street, Mayfair, London
- Resting place: Kensal Green Cemetery
- Spouse: Prince George, Duke of Cambridge (m. 1847, void)
- Partner(s): Charles Manners-Sutton, 2nd Viscount Canterbury; Thomas Bernard
- Children: Charles Fairbrother; Louisa Bernard; George FitzGeorge; Adolphus FitzGeorge; Augustus FitzGeorge
- Parent(s): John Fairbrother; Mary Tucker

Sarah Fairbrother (calling herself Louisa and known from 1859 as Mrs FitzGeorge; 31 October 1814 – 12 January 1890) was an English actress and the mistress of Prince George, Duke of Cambridge, a male-line grandson of George III. As the couple married in contravention of the Royal Marriages Act 1772, their marriage was not recognised under the law.

== Early life ==
Sarah Fairbrother was born in James Street, Westminster, 31 October 1814, and baptised at St George's, Hanover Square, 8 October 1817. The genealogist Anthony J. Camp cites her baptismal record in identifying her parents as John Fairbrother, a servant in Westminster, and Mary (whose maiden name may have been Phillips, but Camp acknowledges the possibility of error owing to the frequency of the surname). Her father was described as a servant in 1813 and 1817, but as a labourer in 1824. His family had no known connection with Robert Fairbrother, the prompter at Drury Lane Theatre, or with the Fairbrother family of printers in Bow Street, Covent Garden, as is frequently stated.

== Stage career ==
Sarah first appeared on the stage in ballet at the Kings Theatre, London; she acted Clara in Luke the Labourer at the Caledonian Theatre, Edinburgh, 3 February 1827; Zephyr in Oberon at the same theatre, 26 August 1827; danced at Covent Garden Theatre 1830–35 and 1837–43; danced at Surrey Theatre, 1832–34; Columbine in pantomime of Valkyrie, 26 December 1832; acted and danced at Drury Lane Theatre, January 1836 to 1837; Columbine in pantomime of Harlequin and Old Gammer Gurton, 26 December 1836; played Margaret in Much Ado About Nothing at Drury Lane, 24 February 1843; member of Lyceum Theatre Company, 8 April 1844 to 11 June 1847 and 18 October 1847; acted Transimenus in Planche's The Golden Branch, 3 January 1848; and was 'considered the most lovely woman of her time'.

== Personal life ==
Sarah had an illegitimate son, Charles Manners Sutton Fairbrother, on 8 August 1836. According to Camp, he was "probably" son of Charles John Manners Sutton, later 2nd Viscount Canterbury (1812–1869). He died unmarried at 19 Pall Mall, Middlesex, 14 March 1901. Sarah's illegitimate daughter, Louisa Catherine, was born on 22 March 1839, and baptised as if she were legitimate, with the surname Bernard (although her birth was not registered under either Bernard or Fairbrother). Her father was Thomas Bernard (1816–1882), of Castle Bernard, King's County, Ireland (son of the Irish politician Thomas Bernard), who made provision for her at the time of her marriage. Louisa Catherine died without issue in 1919.

=== Marriage ===
Sarah Fairbrother met Prince George of Cambridge, the son of Prince Adolphus, Duke of Cambridge and Princess Augusta of Hesse-Kassel, on 10 February 1840, and had two illegitimate children by him: George in 1843 and Adolphus in 1846. She was pregnant with a third child, Augustus (born 12 June 1847) when she obtained a marriage licence from the Faculty Office on 17 December 1846. The pair subsequently went through a form of marriage on 8 January 1847, at St John Clerkenwell, London, Prince George describing himself in the register as 'George Frederick Cambridge, gentleman' and signing as 'George Cambridge'. However, under the Royal Marriages Act 1772, Prince George was required to seek the permission of the British monarch (at that time his cousin, Queen Victoria) to marry, but failed to do so as permission to marry an actress with four illegitimate children by three fathers would never have been given. The marriage was therefore void from the outset.

Legend created for the couple an idyllic relationship that seems far from the reality, she having many moments of suspicion and jealousy and he frequently lying about his affairs. She was an invalid from 1867. The Prince's comment in 1884 that 'when a man, through some unfortunate accident, makes a great mistake, he must abide by it' was taken to refer to their illegal marriage. In The Royal George (Butler & Tanner, London, 1963), the historian Giles St Aubyn contested the negative conception of their relationship, writing: that it was popular with "most Englishmen"; that Prince George mourned Sarah, visiting their home to "take affectionate leave", and stating that her death "overwhelmed (him) with grief and sorrow"; and that, on the anniversary of her death, Prince George wrote of "the intense sorrow that oppresses and depresses my heart".

=== Mrs FitzGeorge ===
As her marriage was unlawful, Sarah could not use the title of Duchess of Cambridge or the style Her Royal Highness. Instead, she was first known as Mrs Fairbrother and later as Mrs FitzGeorge.

Her three children by the Prince were:

- Colonel George FitzGeorge (24 August 1843 – 2 September 1907); married Rosa Baring (9 March 1854 – 10 March 1927), daughter of William Baring of Norman Court, Hants., by Elizabeth Hammersley.
- Rear Admiral Sir Adolphus FitzGeorge, KCVO (30 January 1846 – 17 December 1922); married (1) Sofia Holden (1857 – 3 February 1920), daughter of Thomas Holden of Winestead Hall, Hull; and had issue; (2) Margaret Watson (1863 – 26 February 1934), daughter of John Watson of Waresley Court, Hartlebury; no issue.
- Colonel Sir Augustus FitzGeorge, KCVO, CB (12 June 1847 – 30 October 1933).

Sarah FitzGeorge died at 6 Queen Street, Mayfair, on 12 January 1890, and her body was deposited in the Mausoleum commissioned by the Prince at Kensal Green Cemetery, London, 16 January 1890, very near to another of the Prince's mistresses, Louisa Beauclerk, who had died in 1882. He had decided in 1849 that he would be buried near Beauclerk, whom he had known since 1837. He saw much of her from 1847, and she was his mistress from 1849. The prince later described her as 'the idol of my life and my existence'.

== See also ==
- List of entertainers who married titled Britons
