= Anthony J. Camp =

British Genealogist

Anthony J. Camp MBE
- Born: November 1937 (age 88); Walkern, East Hertfordshire
- Education: Alleyne's Grammar School; University College London
- Known for: Genealogy
- Awards: Freedom of the City of London (1984); MBE (1999)
- Scientific career
- Workplaces: Society of Genealogists; Association of Genealogists and Record Agents; Birkbeck College, University of London
- Website: anthonyjcamp.com

Anthony John Camp MBE (born November 1937) is a British genealogist and former director of the Society of Genealogists.

== Early life and education ==
Camp was born at Walkern, near Stevenage, Hertfordshire. His father was an agricultural carpenter and builder, particularly of corn-drying silos for farmers, and his mother worked at Walkern Hall; the family lived at the estate lodge, where Camp remained until his mother's death in 1973, at which time he moved to London.

Camp was educated at Alleyne's Grammar School in Stevenage, and at University College London, where he took a BA with honours in Ancient and Medieval History.

== Career ==
Camp has described genealogy as "a very exact science that makes a clear distinction between the facts that have been proved and those that have not", claiming that the distinction between the two can be confirmed by "one's expertise and knowledge of sources".

Having started work at the Society of Genealogists under Sir Anthony Wagner as a research assistant in 1957, Camp became Director of Research there in 1962, and Director (and Company Secretary) of the Society in 1979. He oversaw the first weekend course in genealogy in 1965, and played a major role in development of regular publishing and a bookshop at the Society.

Camp has written numerous books on genealogy, the first being Tracing Your Ancestors (1964). His "Diary of a Genealogist" appeared in Family Tree Magazine from 1984 to 1998. He has lectured in Britain as well as overseas, including in the United States and Australia. Camp played a leading part in the foundation of the Association of Genealogists and Record Agents in 1968, serving as vice-president from 1980 to 2011, and elected a Fellow in 2011. For many years he served as External Assessor for the University of London's courses in Genealogy and the History of the Family organised at Birkbeck College.

Camp was given the Freedom of the City of London in 1984, and was appointed MBE in 1999.

== Selected publications ==
- Tracing Your Ancestors (Foyle's Handbook, 1964, 1966, 1970) ISBN 0-7071-0461-0.
- My Ancestors Moved (in England or Wales): how can I trace where he came from? (Society of Genealogists, London, 1994) ISBN 0946789 80 0. Previously published as My Ancestor was a Migrant (in England or Wales): How can I trace where he came from (Society of Genealogists, 1987).
- My Ancestors Came with the Conqueror: Those Who Did and Some of Those Who Probably Did Not Society of Genealogists, 1988, 1990) ISBN 0 946789 02 9 and (Genealogical Publishing Company, Baltimore, 1990) ISBN 0-8063-1390-0.
- Wills and their whereabouts: being a thorough revision and extension of the previous work of the same name by B. G. Bouwens (Phillimore & Co Ltd, Canterbury, for Society of Genealogists, 1963). 4th edition Revised and extended, Anthony J. Camp, London 1974, ISBN 09503308 0 9.
- Everyone has Roots: an introduction to genealogy (W. H. Allen, London, and Genealogical Publishing Company, Baltimore, 1978) ISBN 0 352 30195 3.
- Roses in December: some thoughts on tangled roots and recording our memories: an after-dinner talk to the Cambridge University Heraldic and Genealogical Society 24 February 1983 based on another to the Birmingham and Midland Society for Genealogy and Heraldry 18 June 1982 (Anthony Camp, London, 1983) ISBN 0-9503308-1-7.
- First Steps in Family History (Society of Genealogists, London, 1993, 1995, 1996, 1998) ISBN 1 85951 012 4.
- Sources for Irish Genealogy in the Library of the Society of Genealogists (Society of Genealogists, London, 1990, 1998) ISBN 1 85951 501 0.
- An Index to the Wills Proved in the Prerogative Court of Canterbury, 1750-1800 (6 volumes, Society of Genealogists, London, 1976–1992): vol. 1 (A-Bh, 1976) ISBN 0 901878 18 9; vol. 2, Bi-Ce, 1977) ISBN 0 901878 25 1; vol. 3 (Ch-G, 1984) ISBN 0 901878 68 5; vol. 4 (H-M, 1988) ISBN 0946789 03 7; vol. 5 (N-Sh, 1991) ISBN 0 946789 31 2; vol. 6 (Si-Z, 1992) ISBN 0 946789 58 4.
- Royal Mistresses and Bastards, Fact and Fiction, 1714-1937 (Anthony Camp, London, 2007) ISBN 978-0-9503308-2-2.
- On the City's edge: a history of Fann Street, London (Anthony Camp, London, 2016) ISBN 978-0-9503308-3-9.
