= George Wombwell (disambiguation) =

George Wombwell was a proprietor of Wombwell's Travelling Menagerie.

George Wombwell may also refer to:

- Sir George Wombwell, 1st Baronet (1734–1780), British MP for Huntingdon 1774–1780
- Sir George Wombwell, 2nd Baronet (1769–1846), English cricketer
- Sir George Wombwell, 3rd Baronet (1792–1855) of the Wombwell baronets
- George Philip Frederick Wombwell, presumed 7th Baronet (born 1949) of the Wombwell baronets
- Sir George Orby Wombwell (1832–1913), British baronet

== See also ==
- Wombwell baronets, of Wombwell in the County of York, a title in the Baronetage of Great Britain
