= Sir George Wombwell, 3rd Baronet =

British baronet

Sir George Wombwell, Bt
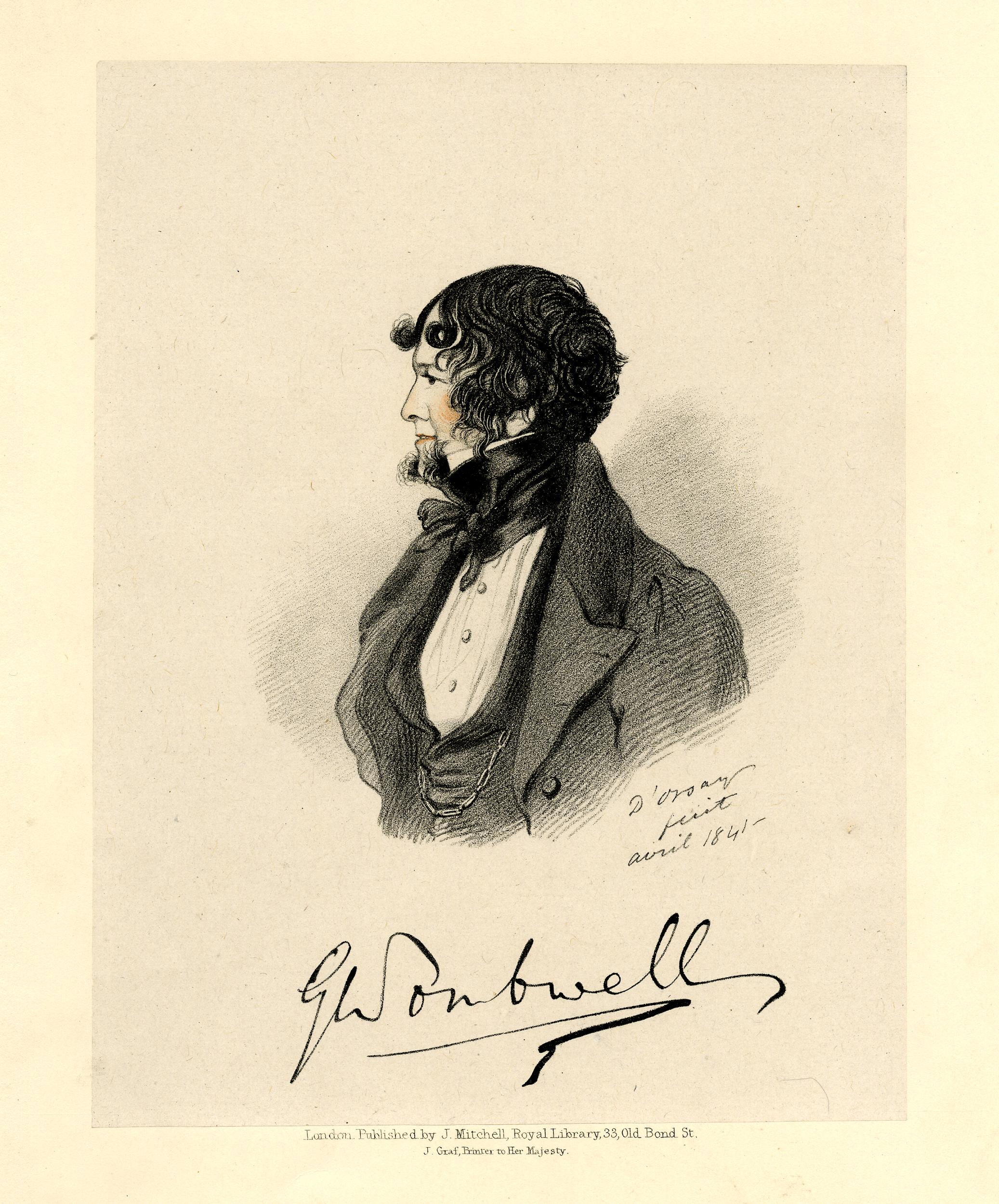
- Pencil and chalk drawing of Sir George by Count Alfred d'Orsay, 1841
- Born: 13 April 1792
- Died: 14 January 1855 (aged 62); St George Hanover Square
- Spouse: Georgiana Hunter (m. 1824; died 1855)
- Children: 4, including George
- Parent(s): Sir George Wombwell, 2nd Baronet; Lady Anne Belasyse
- Relatives: Sir George Wombwell, 1st Baronet (grandfather); Henry Belasyse, 2nd Earl Fauconberg (grandfather)

Sir George Wombwell, 3rd Baronet (13 April 1792 – 14 January 1855) was a British baronet.

== Early life ==
Wombwell was born on 13 April 1792. He was the eldest son of Sir George Wombwell, 2nd Baronet and Lady Anne Belasyse. After his mother's death in 1808, his father married Eliza Little, daughter of T. E. Little. From his parents' marriage, he had a younger brother, Henry Walter Wombwell, who died unmarried. From his father's second marriage, he had a half-sister, Louisa (née Wombwell) Beauclerk (best known for her lengthy relationship with Prince George, Duke of Cambridge, grandson of King George III and cousin of Queen Victoria), and a half-brother, Charles Orby Wombwell (who married his wife's sister, Charlotte Catherine Hunter, in 1836).

His paternal grandparents were Sir George Wombwell, 1st Baronet and Susannah Rawlinson (a daughter of Sir Thomas Rawlinson). His maternal grandparents were Henry Belasyse, 2nd Earl Fauconberg of Newborough, Yorkshire, and the former Hon. Charlotte Lamb (daughter of Sir Matthew Lamb, 1st Baronet and sister of Peniston Lamb, 1st Viscount Melbourne). His aunt, Lady Elizabeth Belasyse, was married to Bernard Howard, 12th Duke of Norfolk.

== Career ==
Upon the death of his father on 28 October 1846, George, who was "well-known in fashionable circles", succeeded as the 3rd Baronet Wombwell, of Wombwell, and inherited Newburgh Priory in Coxwold, North Yorkshire, the old seat of the Belasyses.

Sir George never took part in "public politics" and was mainly known "in the fashionable world, and on the Turf".

== Personal life ==
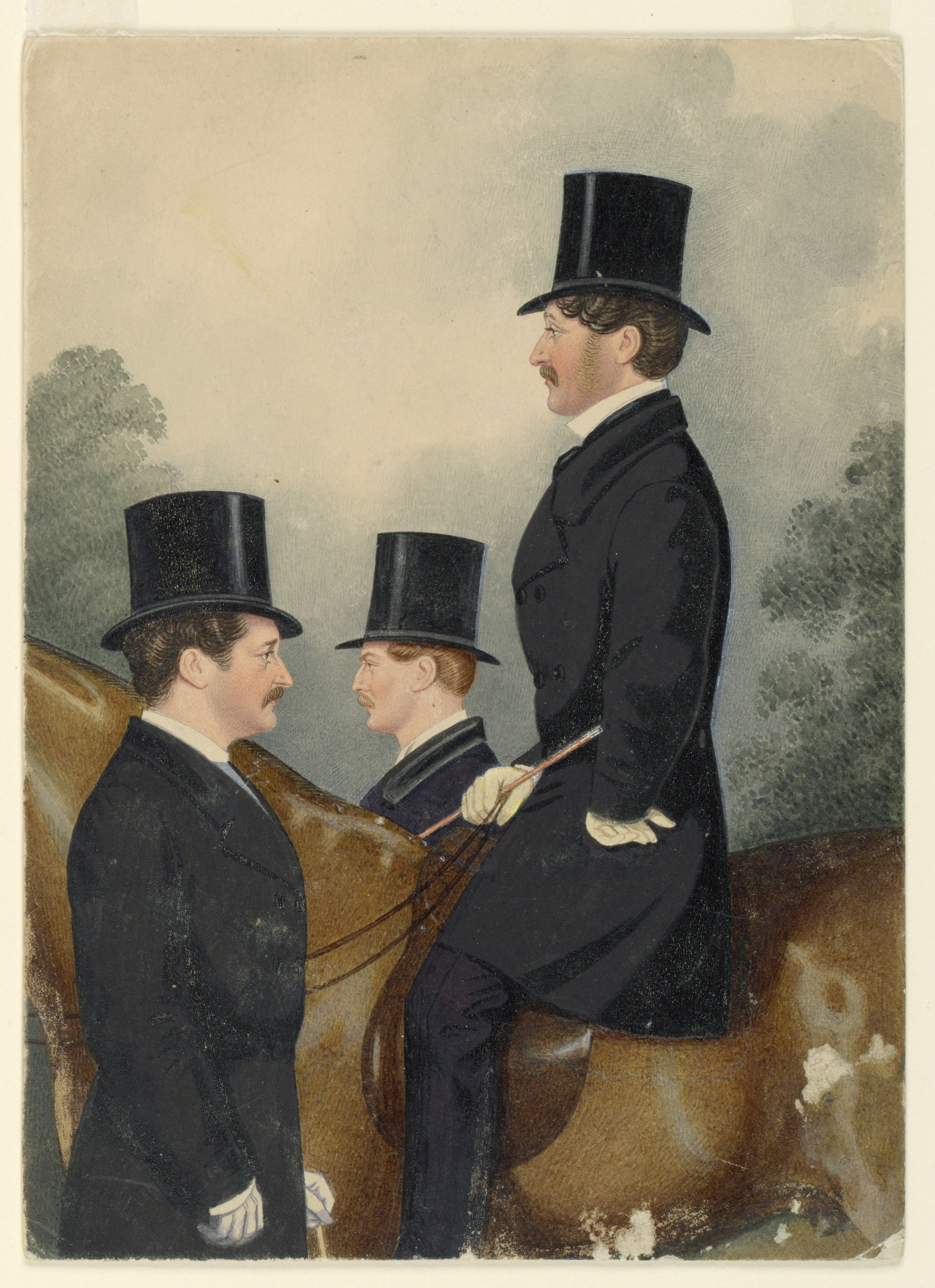
Anonymous portrait of his sons, 1870–80

On 23 June 1824, Wombwell married Georgiana Hunter (1807–1875) at the bride's father's house in Grosvenor Place, London. She was the youngest daughter of Thomas Orby Hunter (a grandson of Thomas Orby Hunter, MP for Winchelsea) and Frances Heywood (daughter of James Modyford Heywood). Together, they were the parents of:

- Sir George Orby Wombwell, 4th Baronet (1832–1913), who married Lady Julia Sarah Alice Child-Villiers, daughter of George Child-Villiers, 6th Earl of Jersey and Julia Peel (daughter of the Prime Minister, Sir Robert Peel), in 1861.
- Adolphus Ulick Wombwell (1834–1886), a Lt.-Col. in the 12th Lancers who married Mary Caroline Myddelton-Biddulph, daughter of Col. Robert Myddelton-Biddulph of Chirk Castle, in 1862. Mary's brother, Richard Myddelton Biddulph, married Catherine Arabella Howard (granddaughter of Edward Charles Howard who was a younger brother of the 12th Duke of Norfolk).
- Sir Henry Herbert Wombwell, 5th Baronet (1840–1926), a captain in the Royal Horse Guards who married Hon. Myrtle Mabel Muriel Mostyn, daughter of Maj. Hon. George Charles Mostyn and sister to the 7th Baron Vaux of Harrowden, in 1902.
- Frederick Charles Wombwell (1845–1889), a Captain who married Marie "Mina" Boyer in 1868.

Sir George died suddenly on 14 January 1855, at his townhouse at 15 St George Hanover Square.

=== Descendants ===
Through his youngest son Frederick, he was a grandfather of Frederick Adolphus Wombwell (father of Sir Frederick Wombwell, 6th Baronet) and Almina Herbert, Countess of Carnarvon.

Baronetage of Great Britain
Preceded by George Wombwell	Baronet (of Wombwell); 1846–1855	Succeeded by George Orby Wombwell
