= Henry Seymour (Redland) =

British politician

Henry Seymour (21 October 1729 – 14 April 1807) was a British politician.

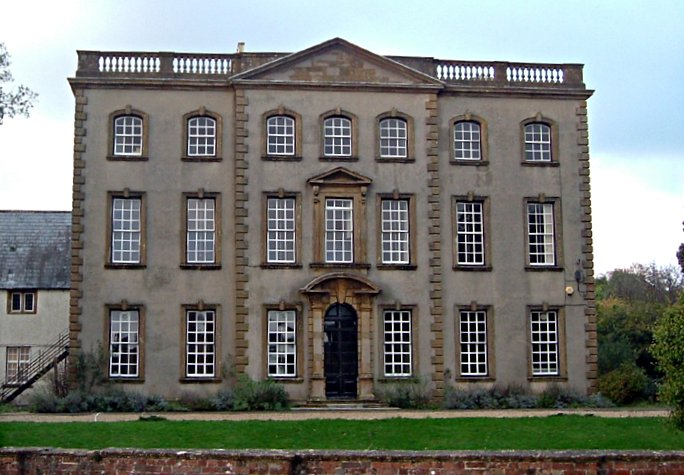
Sherborne House, Dorset (now a school)

== Life ==
Seymour was the eldest son of Francis Seymour, of Sherborne, Dorset. He was educated at New College. In January 1746/7, he inherited the estate of East Knoyle from his uncle, William.

In 1753, Seymour married Lady Caroline Cowper (d. 1773), daughter of William Clavering-Cowper, 2nd Earl Cowper, by whom he had two daughters:

- Caroline Seymour (31 January 1755 – 20 March 1821), married in September 1775 William Danby, of Swinton Park (b. 9 July 1752)
- Georgiana Amelia Seymour (31 Dec 1756 – ?), married on 27 September 1794 Félicité Jean Louis de Durfort, Comte de Deyme (4 March 1752 – 10 March 1801)

He inherited an estate at Sherborne, Dorset upon the death of his father in December 1761, and also owned estates at Redland Court, Gloucestershire, and Northbrook, Devon (since absorbed by Exeter). After his father's death, he entered politics, obtaining the office of Groom of the Bedchamber on 16 February 1763 and being returned as Member of Parliament for Totnes in a by-election that year. On 17 January 1765, he resigned his office as Groom of the Bedchamber. In 1768, he was returned for Huntingdon. After buying an estate at Norton, Worcestershire, he was returned as a Whig for Evesham in 1774, but did not stand in 1780. He is only known to have addressed the House once, in 1776, supporting Fox's motion to inquire into the mismanagement of the American war.

On 5 October 1775, after the death of his first wife in 1773, he married the widow Anne Louise Thérèse, Comtesse de Panthou. Louise (1741–1821) was the daughter of Charles de la Martellière (b1700) and Claudine Louise de Lory (1706–1742). By this marriage they had one son:

- Henry Seymour (1776–1849)

Seymour and his wife moved to Paris in 1778, and he soon after bought an estate at Prunay. Around 1779 or 1780, Seymour became the lover of Madame du Barry. He separated from his second wife in early 1781.

The French Revolution led him to flee France in August 1792, and he lost most of his property in that country through confiscation. He spent the rest of his life in retirement at Knoyle. Seymour is often stated to have died in 1805, but his monument in Exeter Cathedral dates from 1807. By this time, he had disposed of his estates at Sherborne, Redland, and Norton, leaving Knoyle and Northbrook to his son Henry.

Parliament of Great Britain
Preceded by Browse Trist; Richard Savage Lloyd	Member of Parliament for Totnes; 1763–1768; With: Richard Savage Lloyd	Succeeded by Sir Philip Jennings-Clerke; Peter Burrell
Preceded by Edward Montagu; Robert Jones	Member of Parliament for Huntingdon; 1768–1774; With: Robert Jones 1768–1774; Hon. William Augustus Montagu 1774	Succeeded by Hon. William Augustus Montagu; Sir George Wombwell
Preceded by John Rushout; George Durant	Member of Parliament for Evesham; 1774–1780; With: John Rushout	Succeeded by John Rushout; Charles Boughton
