= Thornton-on-the-Hill =

Village and civil parish in North Yorkshire, England

Coordinates: 54.16002°N 1.18587°W

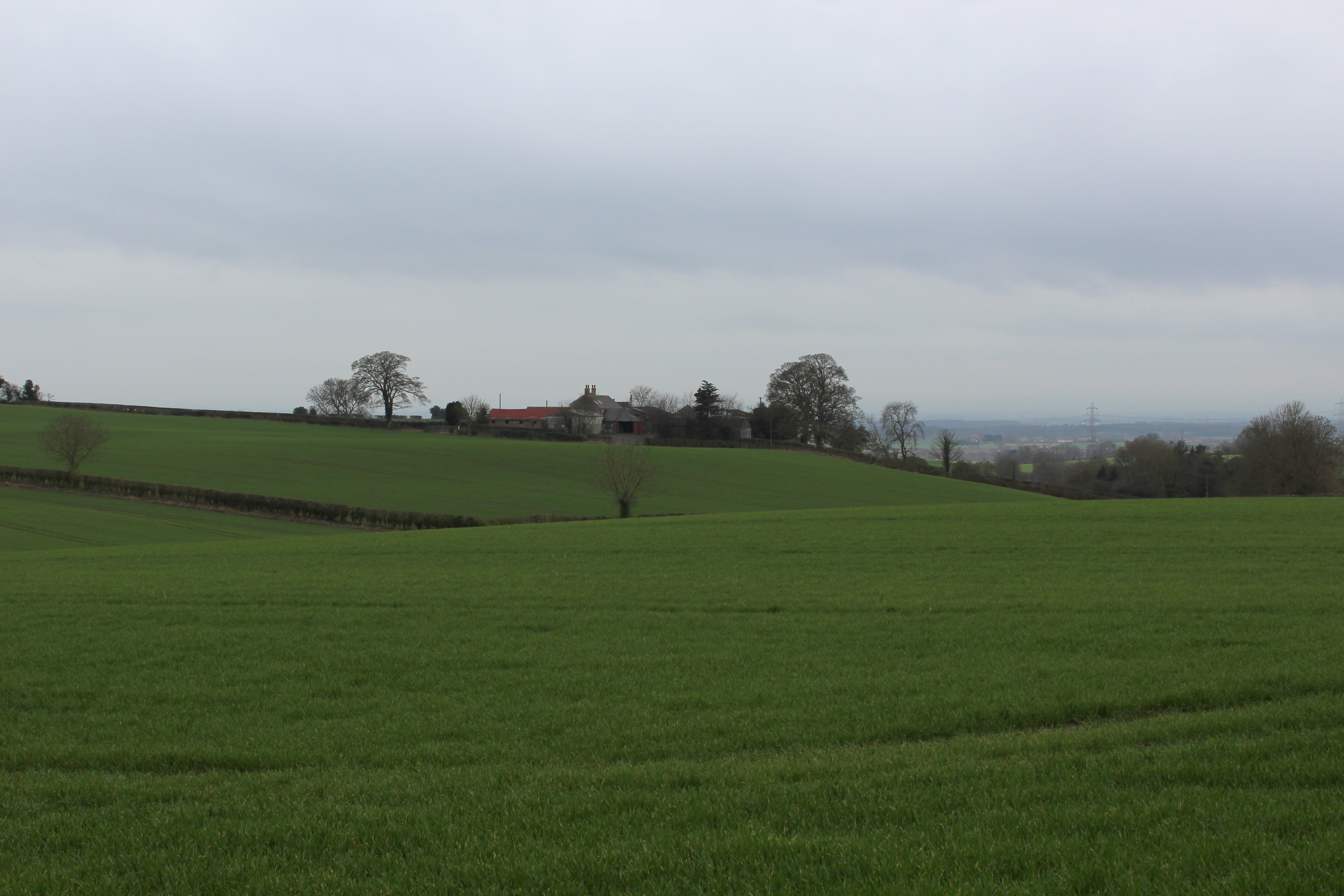
- View towards High House in Thornton-on-the-Hill

- Location within North Yorkshire
- OS grid reference: SE532741
- Civil parish: Thornton-on-the-Hill
- Unitary authority: North Yorkshire
- Ceremonial county: North Yorkshire
- Region: Yorkshire and the Humber
- Country: England
- Sovereign state: United Kingdom
- Post town: York
- Postcode district: YO61
- Police: North Yorkshire
- Fire: North Yorkshire
- Ambulance: Yorkshire

Thornton-on-the-Hill (also called Thornton Hill) is a small dispersed village and civil parish in the county of North Yorkshire, England, about two miles to the north of Easingwold. The population of the civil parish taken at the 2011 Census was less than 100. Details are included in the civil parish of Oulston.

From 1974 to 2023 it was part of the Hambleton District, it is now administered by the unitary North Yorkshire Council.

== History ==
The 'thorn hill' from which the settlement takes its name was first recorded in 1167. On the flat of the hill, earthworks show the remains of house sites, tracks and fishponds, that belonged to the deserted medieval Thornton village.

Some of the building materials from the former village were incorporated into the nearby Grade II listed High House in Thorton Lane. High House was built in the 15th century, with the rear wing dating to the following century and further renovations in the mid-late 19th century for then owner George Orby Wombwell.

During the 1800s, the settlement's population remained at around 70 people with a mid-century peak of 97 in 1861.
