= Sir George Wombwell, 2nd Baronet =

English cricketer

George Wombwell
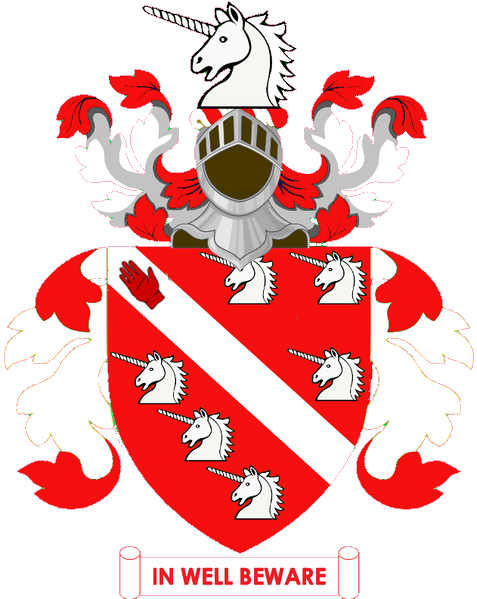
- Arms as baronet

Personal information
- Full name: George Wombwell
- Born: 14 March 1769; England
- Died: 28 October 1846 (aged 77); England

Domestic team information
- Years: Team
- 1792: Marylebone Cricket Club (MCC)
- Source: CricketArchive, 20 March 2013

Sir George Wombwell, 2nd Baronet (14 March 1769 – 28 October 1846) was an English cricketer with amateur status who played for the Marylebone Cricket Club.

== Early life ==
He was the son of Sir George Wombwell, 1st Baronet and Susannah Rawlinson (a daughter of Sir Thomas Rawlinson and Dorothea (née Ray) Rawlinson). His paternal grandparents were Roger Wombwell and Mary (née Chadwick) Wombwell.

He graduated from Trinity College, Cambridge with a Master of Arts.

== Career ==
He succeeded to his father's baronetcy in 1780 and held the office of Sheriff of Yorkshire from 1809 to 1810.

== Cricket ==
As a cricketer, he played for Marylebone Cricket Club in one important match in 1792, totalling 19 runs with a highest score of 19.

== Personal life ==
Sir George married twice. His first marriage was in 1791 to Lady Anne Belasyse (1760–1808), a daughter of Henry Belasyse, 2nd Earl Fauconberg of Newborough, Yorkshire, and the former Hon. Charlotte Lamb (daughter of Sir Matthew Lamb, 1st Baronet and sister of Peniston Lamb, 1st Viscount Melbourne). Through Lady Anne's sister, Lady Elizabeth, Sir George became a brother-in-law of Bernard Howard, 12th Duke of Norfolk. Before her death in 1808, they were the parents of two sons, including:

- Sir George Wombwell, 3rd Baronet (1792–1855), who married Georgiana Hunter, daughter of Thomas Orby Hunter (a grandson of Thomas Orby Hunter, MP for Winchelsea) and Frances Heywood (daughter of James Modyford Heywood), in 1824.
- Henry Walter Wombwell (1795–1835), who died unmarried.

After her death, he married, secondly, to Eliza Little, daughter of T. E. Little, in 1813. Together, they had a son and a daughter, including:

- Louisa Wombwell (d. 1882), who married widower Henry William Beauclerk, son of John Beauclerk and Mary FitzHugh, in 1840. Henry's first wife was Lady Katherine Ashburnham, a daughter of George Ashburnham, 3rd Earl of Ashburnham. From 1837, she had a lengthy relationship with Prince George, Duke of Cambridge, grandson of King George III and cousin of Queen Victoria.
- Charles Orby Wombwell (1813–1898), who married Charlotte Catherine Hunter (the sister of his elder half-brother's wife Georgiana), in 1836. After her death, he married Frances Jane Baillie, daughter of David Baillie, in 1865.

Sir George died on 28 October 1846. He was succeeded by his eldest son George.

Coat of arms of Sir George Wombwell, 2nd Baronet

Crest
A unicorn's head couped Argent.
Escutcheon
Gules a bend between six unicorns' heads couped Argent.
Motto
In Well Beware

== Bibliography ==
- Haygarth, Arthur (1862). Scores & Biographies, Volume 1 (1744–1826). Lillywhite.

Baronetage of Great Britain
Preceded by George Wombwell	Baronet (of Wombwell); 1780–1846	Succeeded by George Wombwell
