= Newburgh, North Yorkshire =

Village and civil parish in North Yorkshire, England

Coordinates: 54.183°N 1.156°W

Newburgh
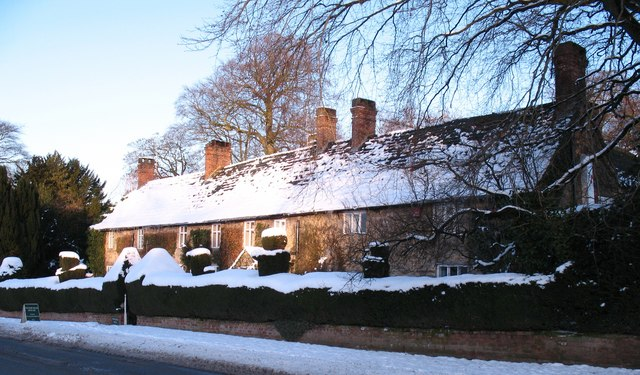
- Newburgh House

- Location within North Yorkshire
- Population: 85
- Civil parish: Newburgh
- Unitary authority: North Yorkshire
- Ceremonial county: North Yorkshire
- Region: Yorkshire and the Humber
- Country: England
- Sovereign state: United Kingdom
- Post town: YORK
- Postcode district: YO61
- Police: North Yorkshire
- Fire: North Yorkshire
- Ambulance: Yorkshire

Newburgh is a village and civil parish located in the county of North Yorkshire, England. The population at the 2011 Census was less than 100. Details are maintained in the civil parish of Coxwold.

The village is mainly a large farming community, the main road passing through the village is 'Colley Broach Road'. Newburgh village leads directly into Newburgh Grange. The local schools and colleges are about 10 minutes drive away in either Ampleforth, Oulston or Thirsk.

From 1974 to 2023 it was part of the Hambleton District, it is now administered by the unitary North Yorkshire Council.

== See also ==
- Listed buildings in Newburgh, North Yorkshire
