= William Augustus Montagu (MP) =

Hon. William Augustus Montagu (1752–1776) was a British politician who sat in the House of Commons from 1774 to 1776.

Montagu was the second surviving son of John Montagu, 4th Earl of Sandwich and his wife Dorothy (in some sources Judith), daughter of Charles Fane, 1st Viscount Fane, and was baptized on 12 February 1752. He was educated at Eton College in 1759 and was admitted at Trinity College, Cambridge on 16 November 1768. He was also admitted at Lincoln's Inn on 8 December 1768. It was said of Montagu that he possessed great talents, and by good education had every opportunity of cultivating them.... but [was ruined by] dissipated company, habits of extravagance and total neglect of his health and constitution.

It would appear that Lord Sandwich intended to use his son to support his interest in Parliament when the opportunity arose. Montagu was returned unopposed as Member of Parliament for Huntingdon at a by-election on 28 February 1774. He was returned again at the 1774 general election. He is not recorded as speaking or voting in Parliament.

In 1775 for his health Montagu was “obliged to try the air of Lisbon”, “but what could change of air effect, after all the stamina of life were inwardly exhausted?” He died unmarried at Lisbon on 14 January 1776, shortly after his arrival there. His nephew, son of Lord Hinchingbrooke was also called William Augustus Montagu.

Parliament of Great Britain
Preceded by Henry Seymour; Robert Jones	Member of Parliament for Huntingdon; 1774–1776; With: Henry Seymour; George Wombwell	Succeeded by George Wombwell; The Lord Mulgrave
