= Edward Montagu (1692–1776) =

British politician

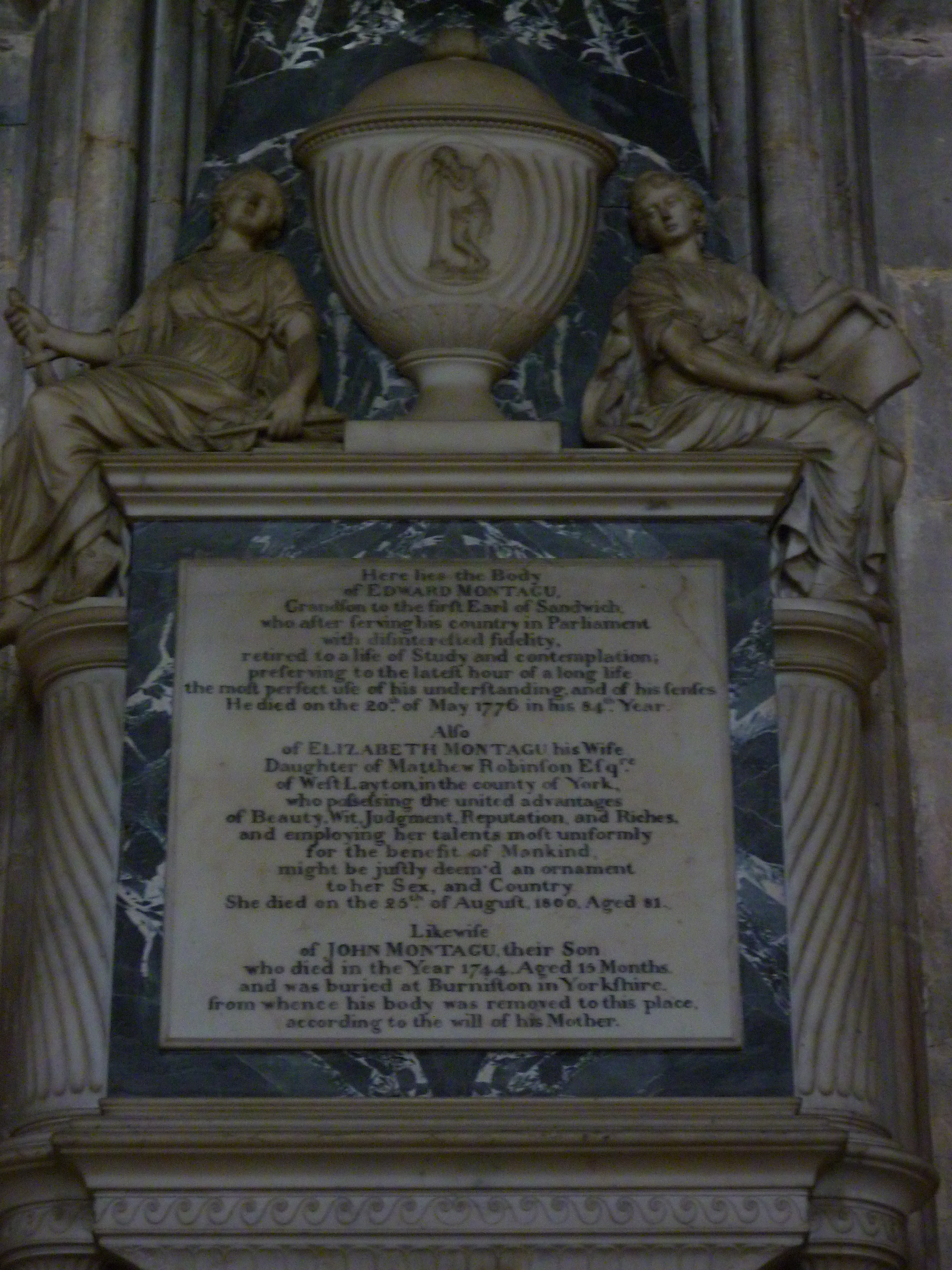
Memorial to Edward and Elizabeth Montagu, and their infant son John, in the North Aisle of Winchester Cathedral.

Edward Montagu (1692–1776) was a wealthy English landowner, who owned numerous coal mines and had several rents and estates in Northumberland. The son of Hon. Charles Montagu, MP, by Sarah Rogers, and the grandson of Edward Montagu, 1st Earl of Sandwich, he was educated at Eton College, Clare College, Cambridge and Lincoln's Inn.

In 1730 he became the leaseholder of the small estate of Sandleford, south of Newbury on the Berkshire-Hampshire border, and in 1742 he married Elizabeth Robinson (despite her seeing marriage as a rational and expedient convention rather than something done out of love). At that date, she was twenty-two and he was fifty years old. The marriage was advantageous, but it was apparently not very passionate. All the same, she bore a son, John, the next year, and she loved her child immensely. When John died unexpectedly in 1744, Elizabeth was devastated and, though the couple remained friendly throughout their remaining time together, there were no more children or pregnancies.

In December 1745 he was elected a Fellow of the Royal Society, on the grounds of being a gentleman of great merit, well versed in mathematical and Philosophical Learning, curious in most of the branches of natural learning, his proposers were Montagu; Martin Folkes; William Jones; John Machin; Shallet Turner; Abraham de Moivre; Peter Davall (d.1763, the society's secretary); and his brother-in-law George L. Scott.

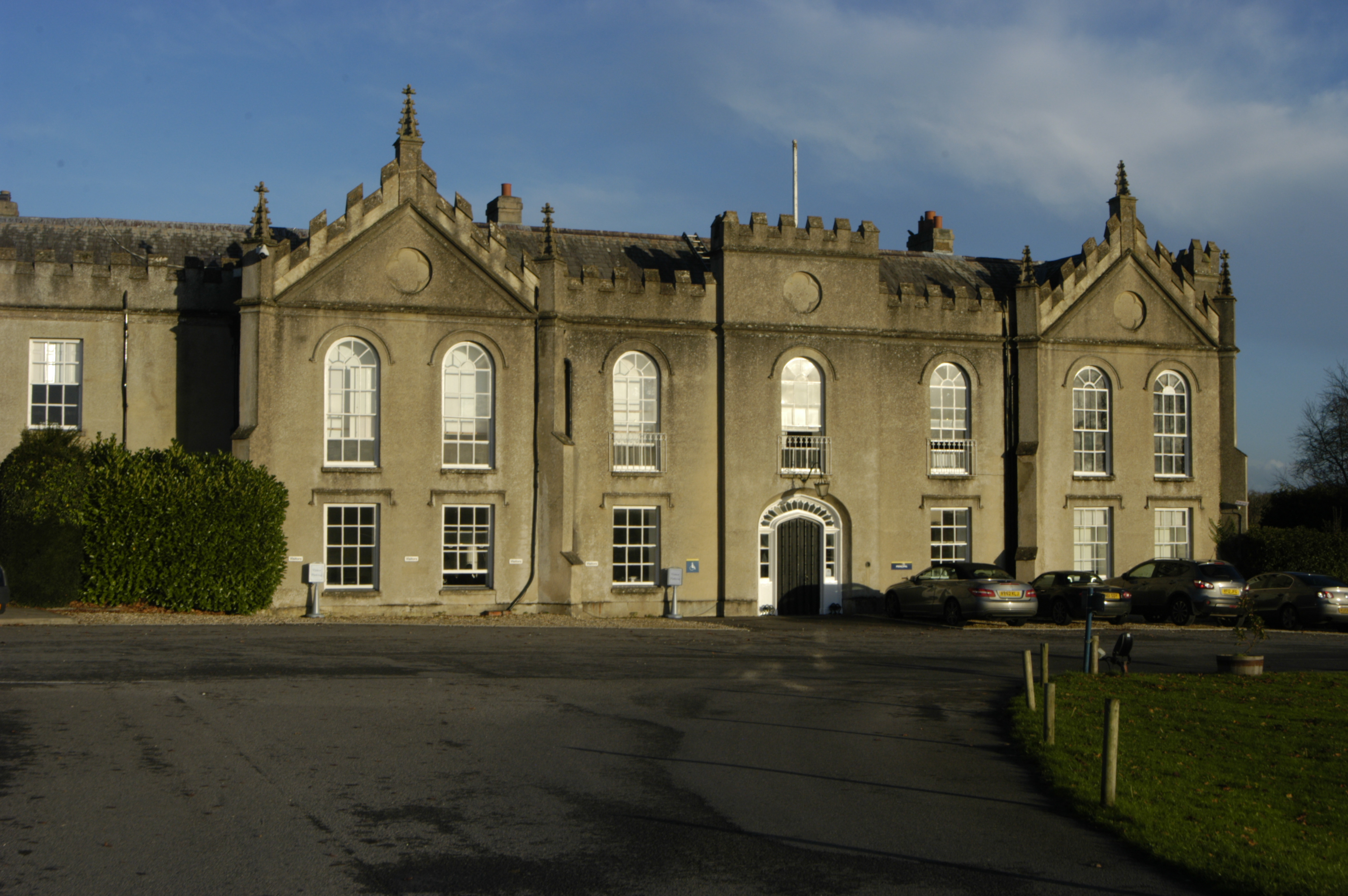
Sandleford Priory

Beginning in 1750, he and Elizabeth established a routine where they would winter in London in Mayfair and then, in the spring, go to Sandleford Priory. He would then go on to Northumberland and Yorkshire to manage his holdings, while she would occasionally accompany him. In the late 1760s, he fell ill, and his wife took care of him, although she resented giving up her freedom. He died on 20 May 1776, in his eighty-fourth year, bequeathing her all his wealth and property.

== MP for Huntingdon ==
For over 30 years, from 1734–1768, Montagu was MP for the borough of Huntingdon, a seat controlled by his cousin John Montagu, 4th Earl of Sandwich.

== Some of Montagu's and his wife's ancestors ==
Some of Edward Montagu and Elizabeth Robinson's ancestors
Some ancestors of Edward Montagu (1692–1776) and his wife Elizabeth Robinson (1718–1800)	Edward Montagu	Hon. Charles Montagu (c.1658–1721), of Belford, Northumberland and Durham. MP. Freeman, Durham 1683; Constable, Durham Castle 1684–1715.	Edward Montagu, 1st Earl of Sandwich, (1625–72), KG, of Hinchingbrooke, Huntingdonshire.
Some ancestors of Edward Montagu (1692–1776) and his wife Elizabeth Robinson (1718–1800)	Edward Montagu	Hon. Charles Montagu (c.1658–1721), of Belford, Northumberland and Durham. MP. Freeman, Durham 1683; Constable, Durham Castle 1684–1715.	Jemima Crew (1625–1674), daughter of John, 1st Baron Crew.
Some ancestors of Edward Montagu (1692–1776) and his wife Elizabeth Robinson (1718–1800)	Edward Montagu	Sarah Rogers. On death of her nephew, John Rogers (1685–1758), the coal-mines of the Denton Hall estate, which had been bought by her father in 1689 and 1705 were inherited by her son Edward;	John Rogers II (1656–1709), of Denton, Newcastle, Northumberland. High Sheriff, 1693.
Some ancestors of Edward Montagu (1692–1776) and his wife Elizabeth Robinson (1718–1800)	Edward Montagu	Sarah Rogers. On death of her nephew, John Rogers (1685–1758), the coal-mines of the Denton Hall estate, which had been bought by her father in 1689 and 1705 were inherited by her son Edward;	Elizabeth Ellison (married 1684), daughter of Benjamin Ellison (died 1676) of Newcastle, merchant adventurer. Knight of the shire, Durham, 1654.
Some ancestors of Edward Montagu (1692–1776) and his wife Elizabeth Robinson (1718–1800)	Elizabeth Robinson	Matthew Robinson (1694–1778), landscape painter and virtuosi, of Edgeley and West Layton, Yorkshire. Of Kent (from 1727) and London (especially as a widower after 1746). Married 1712.	Thomas Robinson (c.1667–1700), son of Sir Leonard Robinson, Kt (1692), merchant, a chamberlain of the City of London.
Some ancestors of Edward Montagu (1692–1776) and his wife Elizabeth Robinson (1718–1800)	Elizabeth Robinson	Matthew Robinson (1694–1778), landscape painter and virtuosi, of Edgeley and West Layton, Yorkshire. Of Kent (from 1727) and London (especially as a widower after 1746). Married 1712.	Elizabeth Clarke, widow of Anthony Light, and daughter of William Clarke, of Merivale Abbey, Warwickshire. Her daughter Lydia Light was the mother-in-law of Rev. Laurence Sterne.
Some ancestors of Edward Montagu (1692–1776) and his wife Elizabeth Robinson (1718–1800)	Elizabeth Robinson	Elizabeth Drake (1693–1746). Educated in a tradition established by Bathsua Makin. Heir of her brother Morris Drake Morris, of East Horton and Mount Morris, circa 1727.	Councillor and recorder Robert Drake of Cambridge (died 1702), of the family Drake of Ash. Lord of the manor of Coveney with Manea.
Some ancestors of Edward Montagu (1692–1776) and his wife Elizabeth Robinson (1718–1800)	Elizabeth Robinson	Elizabeth Drake (1693–1746). Educated in a tradition established by Bathsua Makin. Heir of her brother Morris Drake Morris, of East Horton and Mount Morris, circa 1727.	Sarah Morris (died 1730/31), daughter of Thomas Morris (died 1717) of Mount Morris, Monks Horton, Hythe, Kent. She married 2ndly, 1710, Dr. Conyers Middleton (1683–1750), deist or rationalist theologian, author of Free Inquiry into the Miraculous Powers (1749).

Parliament of Great Britain
Preceded by Edward Wortley Montagu; Roger Handasyde	Member of Parliament for Huntingdon; 1734–1768; With: Roger Handasyde 1734–1741; Hon. Wills Hill 1741; Albert Nesbitt 1741–1747; Kelland Courtenay 1747–1748; John Montagu 1748–1754; Robert Jones 1754–1768	Succeeded by Henry Seymour; Robert Jones
