= Prince George, Duke of Cambridge =

British royal and military commander (1819–1904)

Prince George
- Duke of Cambridge
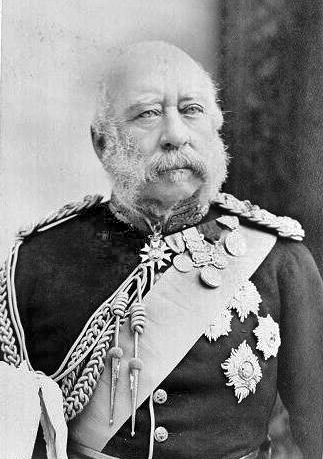
- The Duke of Cambridge, c. 1900
- Born: Prince George of Cambridge; 26 March 1819; Cambridge House, Kingdom of Hanover
- Died: 17 March 1904 (aged 84); Gloucester House, London, England
- Burial: 22 March 1904; Kensal Green Cemetery, London
- Spouse: Sarah Fairbrother (m. 1847, void) (Note: This marriage was contracted in contravention of the Royal Marriages Act 1772, as George failed to seek permission from the then-monarch, his cousin Queen Victoria. The marriage was not legally recognised.)
- Issue: George FitzGeorge; Adolphus FitzGeorge; Augustus FitzGeorge
Names
- George William Frederick Charles
- House: Hanover
- Father: Prince Adolphus, Duke of Cambridge
- Mother: Princess Augusta of Hesse-Kassel
- Military career
- Allegiance: United Kingdom
- Branch: British Army
- Rank: Field marshal
- Commands: Commander-in-Chief of the Forces

Prince George, Duke of Cambridge (George William Frederick Charles; 26 March 1819 – 17 March 1904) was a member of the British royal family, a grandson of King George III and cousin of Queen Victoria. The Duke was an army officer by profession and served as Commander-in-Chief of the Forces (military head of the British Army) from 1856 to 1895, and was raised to the rank of field marshal in 1862. He succeeded to the title of Duke of Cambridge in 1850 upon the death of his father Prince Adolphus, Duke of Cambridge. Deeply devoted to the old Army, he worked with Queen Victoria to defeat or minimise every reform proposal, such as setting up a general staff. His Army's weaknesses were dramatically revealed by the poor organisation at the start of the Second Boer War.

== Early life ==
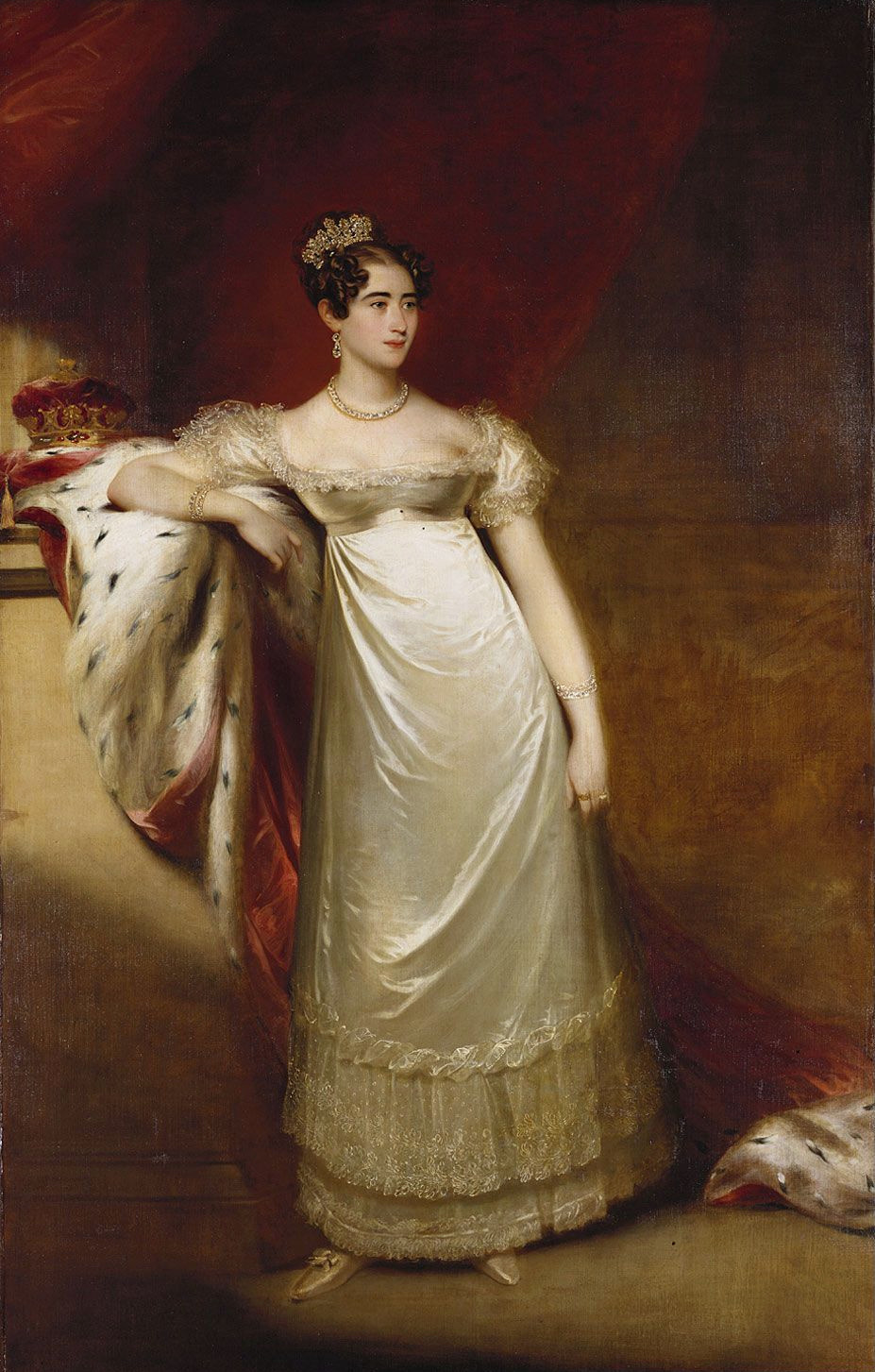
Portrait of his mother, 1818

Prince George was born on 26 March 1819 at Cambridge House, Kingdom of Hanover. His father was Prince Adolphus, Duke of Cambridge, the seventh son of King George III and Queen Charlotte. His mother was the Duchess of Cambridge (née Princess Augusta of Hesse-Kassel).

He was baptised at Cambridge House in Hanover on 11 May 1819, by the Reverend John Sanford, his father's domestic chaplain. His godparents were the Prince Regent (represented by the Duke of Clarence and St Andrews), the Duke of Clarence and St Andrews (represented by the 4th Earl of Mayo) and the Dowager Queen of Württemberg (represented by the Countess of Mayo).

Following his father's death in 1850, he was granted an annuity of £12,000 from the Civil List.

== Military career ==
Prince George of Cambridge was educated in Hanover, and from 1830 in England by the Rev. J. R. Wood, a canon of Worcester Cathedral. Like his father, he embarked upon a military career, initially becoming a colonel in the Royal Hanoverian Army and then, on 3 November 1837, becoming a brevet colonel in the British Army. He was attached to the staff at Gibraltar from October 1838 to April 1839. After serving in Ireland with the 12th Royal Lancers (Prince of Wales's), he was appointed substantive lieutenant-colonel of the 8th Light Dragoons on 15 April 1842 and colonel of the 17th Lancers on 25 April 1842.

From 1843 to 1845, he served as a colonel on the staff in the Ionian islands, then was promoted Major-General on 7 May 1845. He succeeded to his father's titles of Duke of Cambridge, Earl of Tipperary, and Baron Culloden on 8 July 1850.

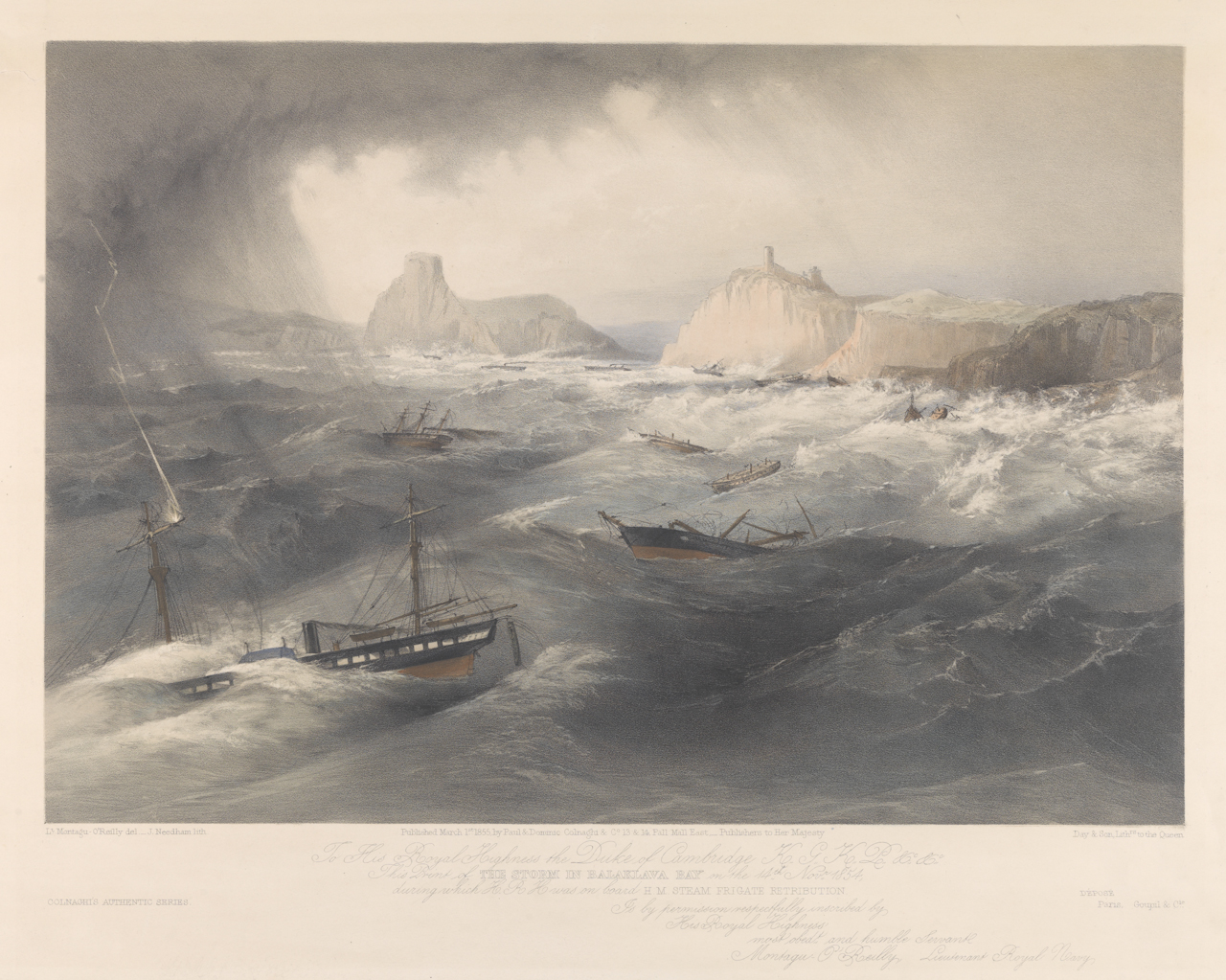
The storm in Balaklava Bay on 14 November 1854, during which HRH was on board the steam frigate HMS Retribution.

The Duke of Cambridge became Inspector of the Cavalry in 1852. In February 1854, at an early stage in the Crimean War of 1853–1856, he received command of the 1st Division (Guards and Highland brigades) of the British army in the East. On 19 June 1854, he was promoted to the rank of lieutenant-general.

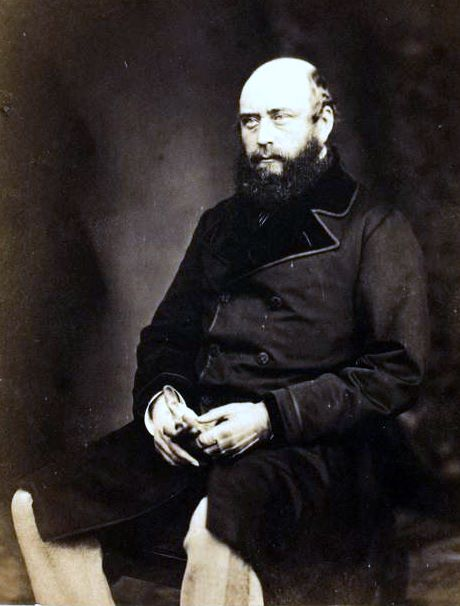
Collodion of Prince George, 1855, by Roger Fenton

He was present at the battles of the Alma (September 1854), Balaclava (October 1854) and Inkerman (November 1854), and at the Siege of Sevastopol (1854–1855).

In December 1854, owing to illness, the Earl of Cardigan returned first to Malta and then to England: before the conclusion of the Crimean campaign, he was back in London. Meanwhile, Lord Raglan died at 9.30 pm on 28 June 1855 from dysentery; General Simpson succeeded Raglan in commanding in the Crimea, followed by General Codrington. Field Marshal Viscount Hardinge, the serving general commanding-in-chief since 1852, was forced to resign in July 1856 on grounds of ill-health. (The Crimean War had ended in March 1856.)

Oriental Army of the Crimean campaign by Gustav Bartsch. From left to right: Admiral Ferdinand-Alphonse Hamelin, Lord Lucan, Lord Raglan, Admiral Dundas, Sir John Campbell, Duke of Cambridge, Lord Cardigan, Ismail Pasha, Omer Pasha, Muhlis Pasha (Grigore Sturdza), Sultan Abdülmecid I, Said-Bey (Vasile Obedeanu), Ahmed Pasha, col. Desmaret, Marshal Baraguey d'Hilliers, Prince Napoleon, col. Trochu, Marshal de Saint-Arnaud, general Bosquet, general de Canrobert

On 5 July 1856, the Duke was appointed general commanding-in-chief of the British Army, a post that was re-titled field marshal commanding-in-chief on 9 November 1862 and commander-in-chief of the forces by Letters Patent on 20 November 1887. In that capacity he served as the chief military advisor to the Secretary of State for War, with responsibility for the administration of the army and the command of forces in the field. He was promoted to the rank of general on 15 July 1856 and to the rank of field marshal on 9 November 1862.

=== Policies ===
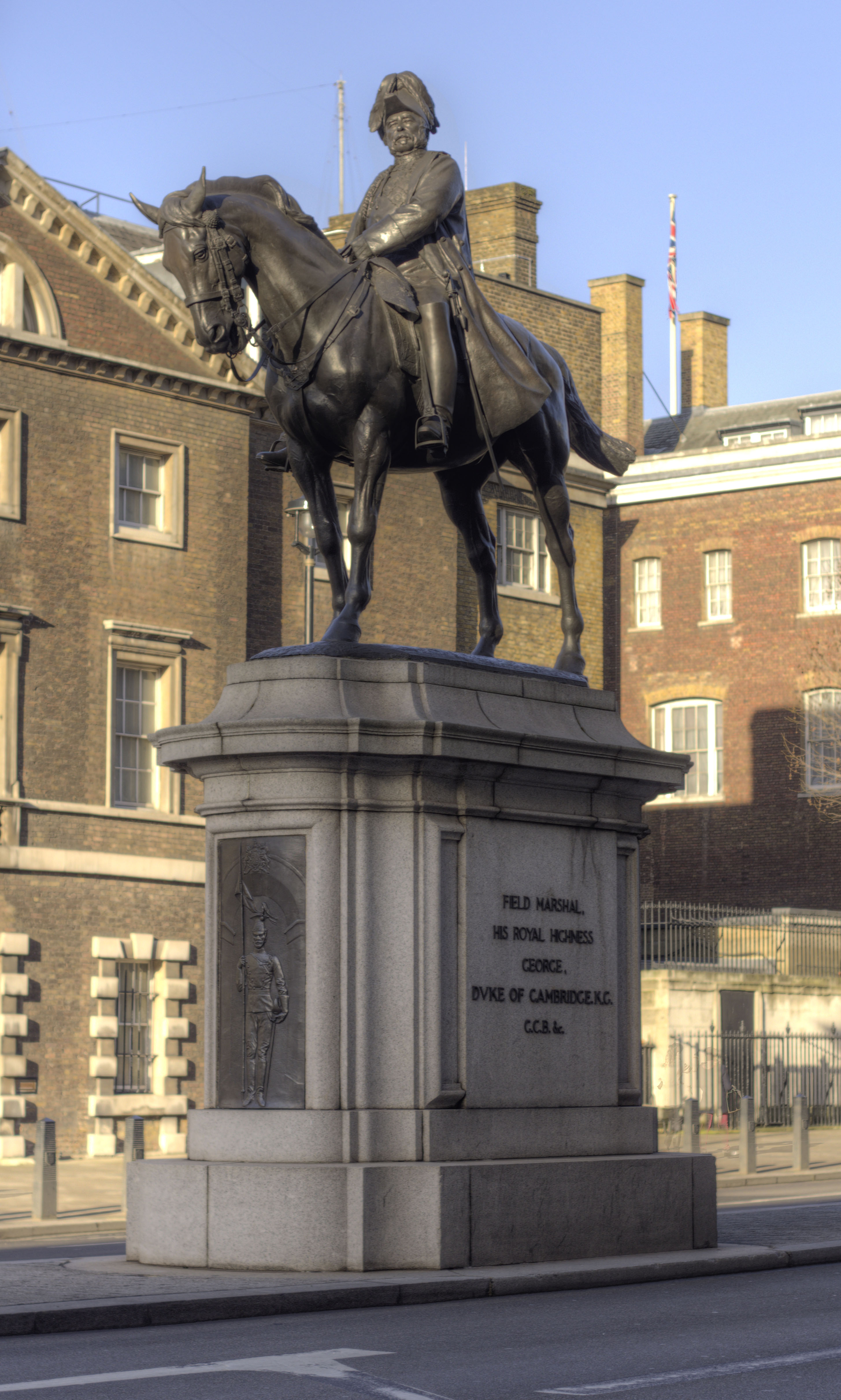
Equestrian statue of the Duke of Cambridge, Whitehall

The Duke of Cambridge served as commander-in-chief for 39 years. Early in his term he encouraged the army to trial various breech-loading carbines for the cavalry, one of which—the Westley Richards—proved so effective that it was decided to investigate the possibility of producing a version for the infantry. In 1861, 100 were issued to five infantry battalions; in 1863 an order of 2,000 was placed for further trials. The Duke was also involved in the formation of the Staff College and of the Royal Military School of Music, and became governor of the Royal Military Academy, Woolwich: he further sought to improve the efficiency of the army by advocating a scheme of annual military manoeuvres. In 1860 he introduced a new system to restrict corporal punishment: soldiers became eligible for flogging only in cases of aggravated mutinous conduct during wartime, unless they committed an offence serious enough to degrade to the second class and make them once again subject to corporal punishment. A year's good behaviour would return them to the first class, meaning that only a hard core of incorrigible offenders tended to be flogged.

=== Opposition to reforms ===
Under the Duke's command, the British Army became a moribund and stagnant institution. He allegedly rebuked one of his more intelligent subordinates with the words: "Brains? I don't believe in brains! You haven't any, I know, Sir!" He was equally forthright on his reluctance to adopt change: "There is a time for everything, and the time for change is when you can no longer help it."

In the wake of the Prussian victories in the 1870–71 Franco-Prussian War, the Liberal Party government of Prime Minister William Ewart Gladstone and Secretary of State for War Edward Cardwell called for the Army to undergo major reforms. Cardwell succeeded in pushing through a number of reforms, including one that made the commander-in-chief nominally report to the secretary of state for war.

The Duke opposed most of the reforms because they struck at the heart of his view of the Army. According to Theo Aronson, he "stoutly resisted almost every attempt at reform or modernization." He feared that the newly created force of reservists would be of little use in a colonial conflict, and that expeditionary forces would have to strip the most experienced men from the home-based battalions in order to fill the gaps in their ranks. His fears seemed to be confirmed in 1873, when Wolseley raided battalions for the expedition against the Ashanti. In 1881, when the historic numbers of regiments were abolished and facing colours standardised for English, Welsh, Scottish, and Irish regiments, the Duke protested that regimental spirit would be degraded; the majority of facing colours were restored by the time of World War I, although the numbers of regiments were not.

The reforming impetus, however, continued. Parliament passed the War Office Act 1870, which formally subordinated the Commander-in-Chief of the Forces to the Secretary of State for War and in 1871 Cardwell abolished the custom of purchasing an office which had done much to instil elitism in the form of discipline and training. The Duke of Cambridge strongly resented this move, a sentiment shared by a majority of officers, who would no longer be able to sell their commissions when they retired.

Pressures for reform built up as the Duke of Cambridge aged; his strongest ally was his cousin, Queen Victoria. While the Queen insisted on reform, she was also protective of the Household brigades and their long association and traditions. An 1890 royal commission led by Lord Hartington (later the 8th Duke of Devonshire) criticised the administration of the War Office and recommended the devolution of authority from the Commander-in-Chief to subordinate military officers. A number of reformers opposed to the Duke banded together, including Henry Campbell-Bannerman and Lord Lansdowne, the Liberal and Conservative Secretaries for War between 1892 and 1900. The leading generals eager to replace the Duke were Wolseley, Buller (1802–1884), Roberts (1832–1914), and the Duke of Connaught (1850–1942). The Duke of Cambridge was forced to resign his post on 1 November 1895, and was succeeded by Lord Wolseley. On his resignation he was given the title of honorary colonel-in-chief to the Forces.

== Friend of Haig ==
During the Duke's long career he helped to further the career progress of Douglas Haig, a talented and able young officer, who succeeded through Staff College to gain promotion. As Commander-in-Chief, the Duke was able to admit any candidate to the college so long as they passed three out of eight of the tests. Haig, who was also acquainted with Sir Evelyn Wood, left for India in 1893 knowing that the Duke had also made a friend of Henrietta Jameson (née Haig), his older sister. The Duke's nomination was made in 1894 and 1895, but Haig did not take up the place until 15 January 1896 under Army Regulations Order 72 (1896). The Duke, who was replaced by Lord Wolseley, after 32 years was not the only patron of preferment. The Staff College was not intended to educate a General Staff until much later in its historical development. However the traditional system of informal patronage was gradually giving way to more than gifted amateurs.

On 22 November 1909 the reforms to which Haig, as Director of Staff Duties was a part, abolished the post of Commander-in-Chief which the Duke had made his own. In setting up the Army Council, with its head being called the Chief of the General Staff by Order in Council, the Liberal government separated the army from the monarchy.

== Marriage and mistress ==
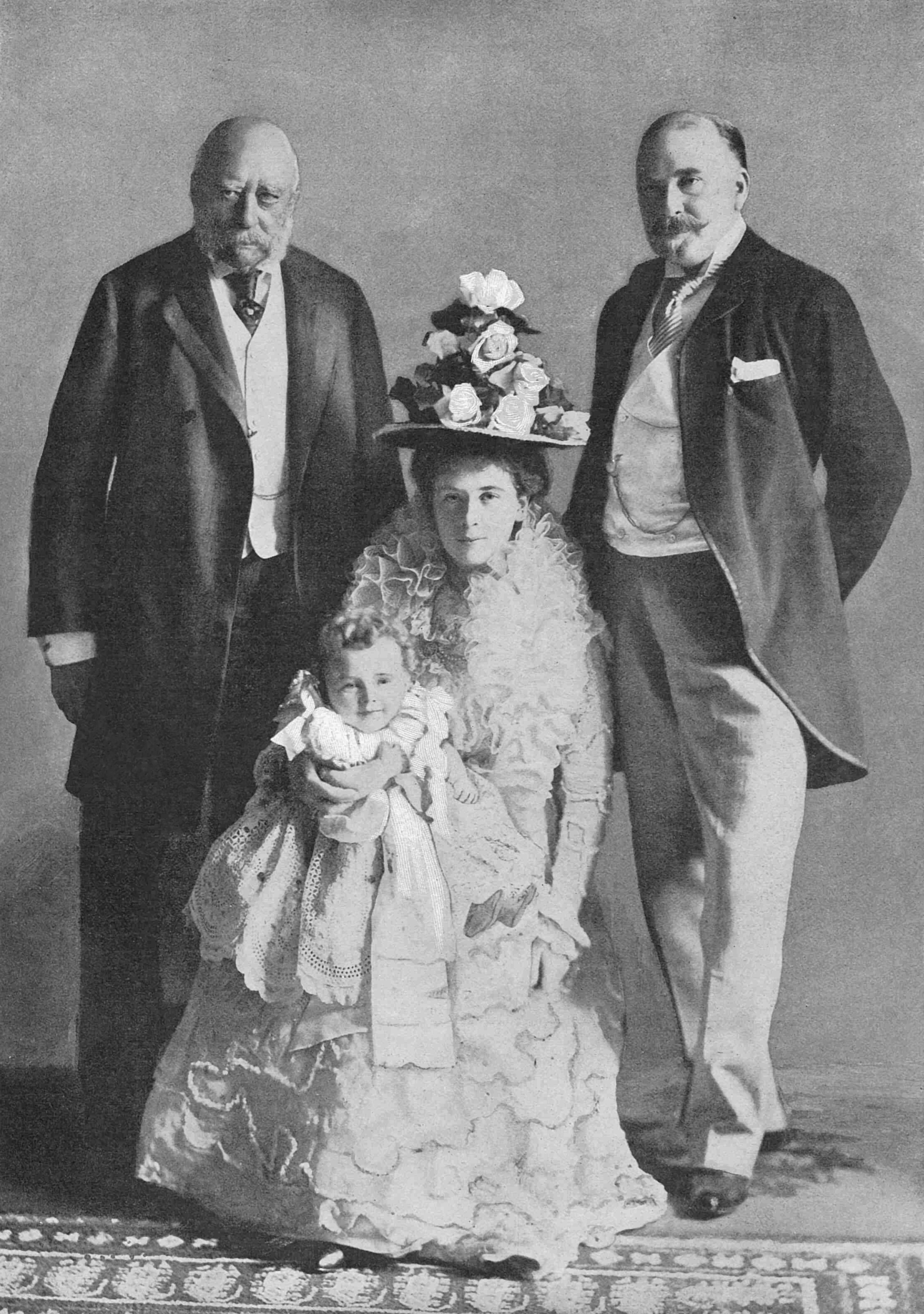
George with his son Adolphus FitzGeorge, his granddaughter Olga FitzGeorge, and great-grandson George FitzGeorge Hamilton in 1900

It is believed, according to Roger Fulford, that William IV, who had been his godfather when Duke of Clarence, had George brought up at Windsor in hope of an eventual marriage to his cousin Princess Victoria of Kent, who was two months younger. This prospective match was favoured by George's own parents, but was forestalled by Victoria's maternal uncle Leopold I of Belgium. He secured Victoria's betrothal to his nephew, Prince Albert of Saxe-Coburg and Gotha, which became formal after she acceded to the British throne. In 1839, Queen Victoria wrote to Albert about George's father: "The Duke told Lord Melbourne he had always greatly desired our marriage, and never thought of George: but that I don't believe." George was one of a range of suitors considered by Victoria, the most prominent of whom, Prince Alexander of the Netherlands, was openly favoured by William.

The Duke of Cambridge made no secret of his view that "arranged marriages were doomed to failure." He married privately, without seeking Queen Victoria's consent, at St John Clerkenwell, London, on 8 January 1847 to Sarah Fairbrother (1816 – 12 January 1890), the daughter of John Fairbrother, a servant in Westminster. Sarah Fairbrother (whose stage name was Louisa) had been an actress since 1827, performing at Drury Lane, the Lyceum, and Covent Garden Theatre. Without the Queen's consent, the wedding ceremony was in contravention of the 1772 Royal Marriages Act, rendering the marriage void. This meant the Duke's wife was not titled Duchess of Cambridge or accorded the style Her Royal Highness, while the son born after the marriage was illegitimate and ineligible to succeed to the Duke's titles. Indeed, Sarah's very existence was ignored by the Queen. Instead, Sarah called herself "Mrs. Fairbrother" and later "Mrs. FitzGeorge". The Duke was a very weak man where women were concerned, and it seems likely that he had been cajoled into marriage by Sarah (then pregnant for the fifth time), she herself obtaining the licence. Legend has created for the couple an ideal relationship that is far from the reality; the Duke having other affairs. From 1837 the Duke had known Louisa Beauclerk, third daughter of Sir George Wombwell, 2nd Baronet, whom he later described as "the idol of my life and my existence." He saw much of her in 1847, and she was his mistress from at least 1849 until her death in 1882. As early as 1849, he had decided that he would be buried near Beauclerk and it was solely on her account that Sarah Fairbrother and he were deposited in the mausoleum in Kensal Green Cemetery, west of the main chapel, about sixty feet away from Beauclerk's grave.

== Later life ==
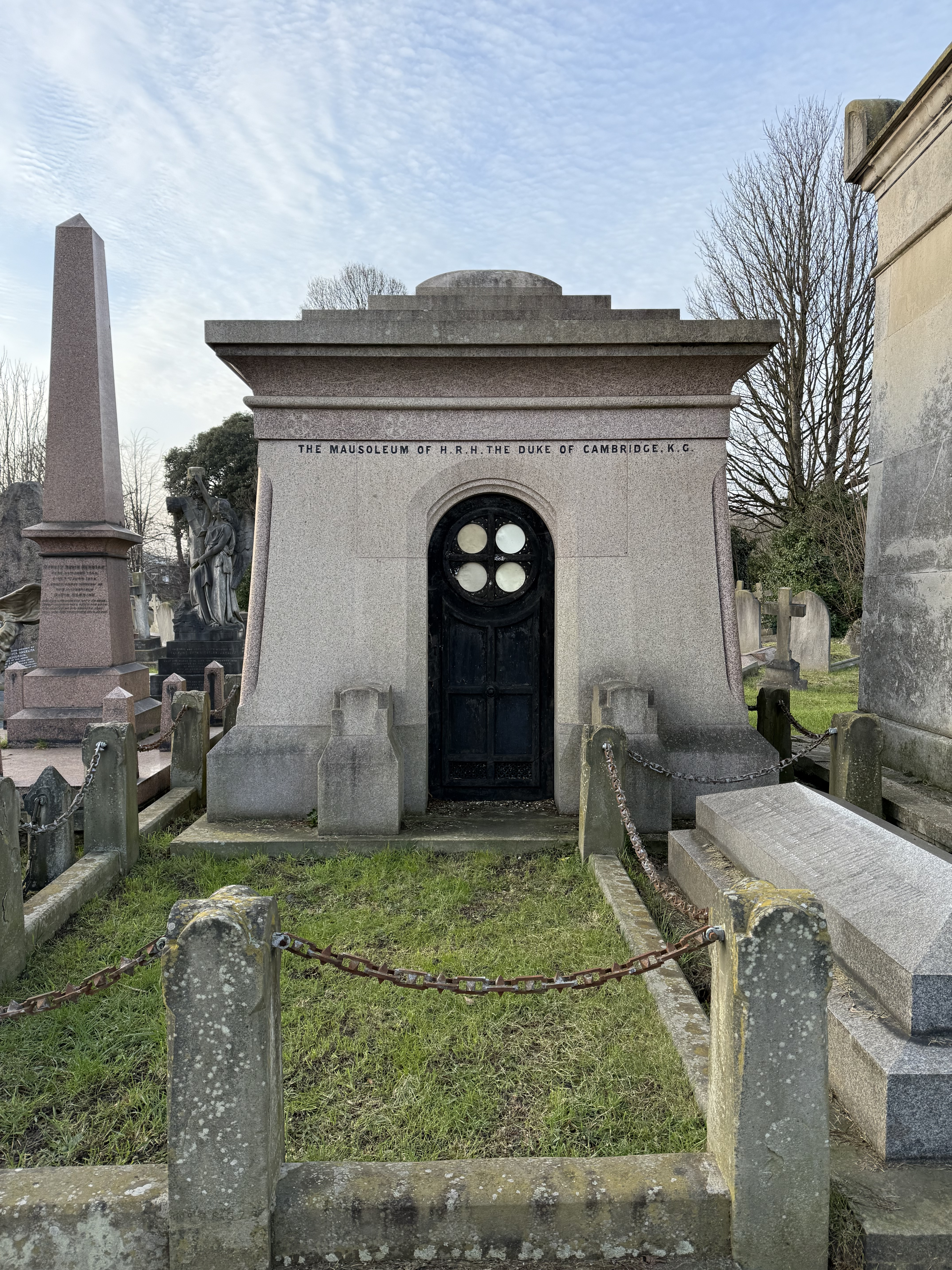
Mausoleum of the Duke, Kensal Green Cemetery, London (February 2025)

The Duke of Cambridge served as colonel-in-chief of the 17th Lancers, Royal Artillery and Royal Engineers; The Middlesex Regiment (Duke of Cambridge's Own) and King's Royal Rifle Corps; colonel of the Grenadier Guards; honorary colonel of the 10th (Duke of Cambridge's Own) Bengal Lancers, 20th Duke of Cambridge's Own Punjabis, 4 Battalion Suffolk Regiment, 1st City of London Volunteer Brigade and the Scots Fusilier Guards. He became the Ranger of Hyde Park and St. James's Park in 1852, and of Richmond Park in 1857; governor of the Royal Military Academy in 1862, and its president in 1870. He was the patron of the Oxford Military College from 1876 to 1896. In 1887, he officially opened the new Charing Cross Road and Cambridge Circus, which is named after him.

Cambridge's strength and hearing began to fade in his later years. He was unable to ride at Queen Victoria's funeral and had to attend in a carriage. He paid his last visit to Germany in August 1903. He died of a haemorrhage of the stomach on 17 March 1904 at his London home, Gloucester House, Mayfair.

On 21 March, following a short service at Gloucester House attended by the royal family, his coffin was carried on a gun carriage, escorted in procession by Grenadier Guards and the Household Cavalry, to Westminster Abbey where it lay overnight in St Faith's Chapel. The next day, 22 March, an elaborate ceremonial funeral was led by the Dean of Westminster and attended by King Edward VII and Queen Alexandra with the Prince and Princess of Wales. Afterwards, the coffin was carried in procession past Buckingham Palace and then on to Kensal Green Cemetery where he was interred in a mausoleum next his wife.

In 1904, his estate was probated at under £121,000.

The Duke is commemorated by an equestrian statue standing on Whitehall in central London; it is positioned outside the front door of the War Office that he so strongly resisted. He is also commemorated by two street names in Kingston Vale and Norbiton, in southwest London, George Road and Cambridge Road; the Duke inherited much of the land in the area from his father in 1850. Cambridge Military Hospital in Aldershot was built during his time as Commander-in-Chief.

== Titles, styles and honours ==
=== Titles and styles ===
- 26 March 1819 – 8 July 1850: His Royal Highness Prince George of Cambridge
- 8 July 1850 – 17 March 1904: His Royal Highness The Duke of Cambridge

As the male-line grandson of a King of Hanover, Prince George of Cambridge also bore the titles of 'Prince of Hanover' and 'Duke of Brunswick and Lüneburg'.

His title, 'Duke of Cambridge', became extinct upon his death. It was revived 107 years later, when Elizabeth II (Prince George's great-grandniece through his sister Princess Mary Adelaide of Cambridge) awarded the title to her grandson, Prince William, on 29 April 2011, the day of his wedding. (Note: This did not become official until 26 May 2011, when Letters Patent to that effect were signed and recorded in the Crown Office on the Roll of the Peerage.)

=== Honours ===
British

- KG: Royal Knight of the Most Noble Order of the Garter, 15 August 1835
- KP: Extra Knight of the Most Illustrious Order of St Patrick, 17 November 1851
- Hon DCL: Doctor of Civil Law, Oxford University, 1853
- GCB: Knight Grand Cross of the Most Honourable Order of the Bath (military division), 5 July 1855
- PC: Privy Counsellor of Great Britain, 1856
- Hon LLD: Doctor of Laws, Cambridge University, 1864
- PC (I): Privy Counsellor of Ireland, 21 April 1868
- Hon LLD: Doctor of Laws, Dublin University, 1868
- GCMG: Grand Master and Principal Knight Grand Cross of the Most Distinguished Order of St Michael and St George, 30 May 1877
- GCSI: Extra Knight Grand Commander of the Most Exalted Order of the Star of India, 2 June 1877
- KT: Extra Knight of the Most Ancient and Most Noble Order of the Thistle, 17 September 1881
- GCIE: Extra Knight Grand Commander of the Most Eminent Order of the Indian Empire, 21 June 1887
- VD: Volunteer Decoration
- ADC: Personal Aide-de-Camp to the Sovereign, 1 November 1895
- KJStJ: Knight of Justice of the Most Venerable Order of the Hospital of St John of Jerusalem, 1896
- GCVO: Knight Grand Cross of the Royal Victorian Order, 30 June 1897

Foreign

- Grand Cross of the Royal Hanoverian Guelphic Order, 1825 (Hanover)
- Grand Cross of the Order of Henry the Lion, 1835 (Brunswick)
- Knight of the Order of St George, 1839 (Hanover)
- Grand Cross of the Royal Order of the Legion of Honour, September 1843 (France)
- Grand Cross of the House Order of the Golden Lion, 18 December 1844 (Hesse-Kassel)
- Knight of the Order of the Black Eagle, 7 September 1852 (Prussia)
- Knight of the House Order of Fidelity, 1856 (Baden)
- Grand Cross of the Order of the Zähringer Lion, 1856 (Baden)
- Grand Cross of the Royal Hungarian Order of St Stephen, 1857 (Austria)
- Knight of the Order of the Gold Lion of the House of Nassau, September 1859 (Nassau)
- Grand Cross of the House Order of the Wendish Crown, with Crown in Ore, 13 August 1865 (Mecklenburg)
- Grand Cross of the Royal Military Order of the Tower and Sword, 8 January 1866 (Portugal)
- Knight of the Order of the Elephant, 26 March 1867 (Denmark)
- Knight of the Order of St Andrew the Apostle the First-called, 1874 (Russia)
- Grand Commander's Cross of the Royal House Order of Hohenzollern, 23 September 1880 (Prussia)

== Issue ==
The Duke of Cambridge and Mrs FitzGeorge had three sons, two of whom were born before their marriage in contravention to the Royal Marriages Act 1772.

Name	Birth	Death	Notes
George FitzGeorge	24 August 1843	2 September 1907	m. Rosa Baring, daughter of William Baring of Norman Court, Hants., by Elizabeth Hammersley; had issue
Sir Adolphus FitzGeorge	30 January 1846	17 December 1922	m. (1) Sofia Holden; had issue (Olga FitzGeorge); (2) Margaret Watson; no issue
Sir Augustus FitzGeorge	12 June 1847	30 October 1933	Col Sir Augustus FitzGeorge, KCVO, CB; never married or had issue

== Bibliography ==
- Cambridge, George, HRH Duke of (1906). Edgar Sheppard (ed.). George, Duke of Cambridge: A Memoir of his Private Life of Based on the journals and correspondence of His Royal Highness. Vol. 2 vols. Longmans & Co.
- Barnett, Correlli (1970). Britain and Her Army 1509-1970: A Military, Political and Social Survey. Allen Lane. ISBN 978-0713901122.
- Beckett, Ian F.W. A British Profession of Arms: The Politics of Command in the Late Victorian Army (U of Oklahoma Press, 2018).
- Ensor, R.C.K. (1963). England 1870–1914, The Oxford history of England 14, New edition. Oxford University Press. ISBN 0-19-285261-2.
- Heathcote, Tony (1999). The British Field Marshals 1736–1997. Pen & Sword Books Ltd. ISBN 0-85052-696-5.
- Parker, Erasmus; Verner, William (2009) [1906]. The Military Life of the Duke of Cambridge. Vol. 2 vols. BiblioBazaar. ISBN 978-1113265166.
- Reid, Walter (2006). Architect of Victory: Douglas Haig. Birlinn. ISBN 978-1841585178.
- Searle, Geoffrey Russell (2004). A New England?: Peace and War, 1886-1918. Oxford U.P. ISBN 9780198207146.
- Spiers, Edward M. (1992). The Late Victorian Army, 1868-1902. Manchester History of the British Army.
- Spiers, Edward M. (1994). David Chandler (ed.). The Late Victorian Army, 1868-1902. The Oxford History of the British Army. pp. 187–210.
- Spiers, Edward M. (2008). "George, Prince, Second Duke of Cambridge (1819–1904)". Oxford Dictionary of National Biography (online ed.). Oxford University Press. doi:10.1093/ref:odnb/33372. (Subscription, Wikipedia Library access or UK public library membership required.)
- St. Aubyn, Giles (1963). The Royal George, 1819–1904: The Life of HRH Prince George, Duke of Cambridge. London: Constable. ISBN 978-0571281701.
- Weir, Alison (1996). Britain's Royal Families: The Complete Genealogy. London: Pimlico. ISBN 978-0099539735.
- "The Late Duke of Cambridge". The Times (Obituary): 7. 19 March 1904.

Prince George, Duke of Cambridge House of Hanover Cadet branch of the House of Welf Born: 26 March 1819 Died: 17 March 1904
Military offices
Preceded by Sir Arthur Benjamin Clifton	Colonel of the 17th Regiment of (Light) Dragoons (Lancers); 1842–1852	Succeeded by Thomas William Taylor
Preceded by Prince Albert	Colonel of the Scots Fusilier Guards; 1852–1861	Succeeded by Sir Alexander Woodford
Preceded by The Viscount Hardinge	Commander-in-Chief of the Forces; 1856–1895	Succeeded by The Viscount Wolseley
Preceded by Prince Albert	Colonel of the Grenadier Guards; 1861–1904	Succeeded by The Duke of Connaught and Strathearn
Other offices
Preceded by The Duke of Cambridge	President of the Foundling Hospital; 1851–1904	Succeeded by The Duke of Connaught and Strathearn
Honorary titles
Preceded by The Duke of Cambridge	Grand Master of the Order of St Michael and St George; 1850–1904	Succeeded by The Prince of Wales
Peerage of the United Kingdom
Preceded by Prince Adolphus	Duke of Cambridge; 4th creation 1850–1904	Extinct Title next held by Prince William
