= Gloucester House, Mayfair =

Building in London

Coordinates: 51.5038308°N 0.1489223°W

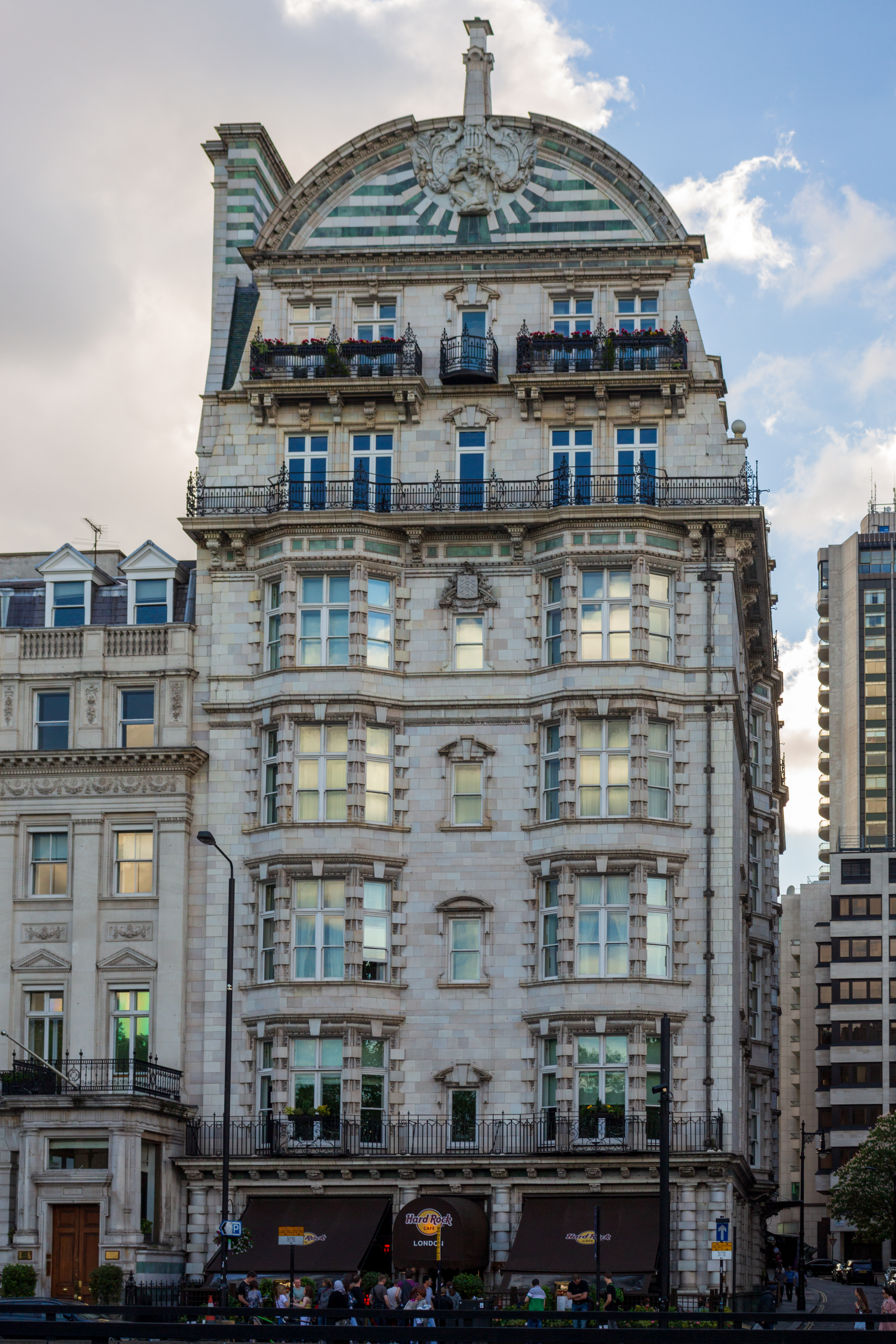
Gloucester House in 2014

Gloucester House is a historic building at 137 Piccadilly, London, on the corner of Old Park Lane.

The original structure was built early in the reign of George III (reigned 1760–1820), and gained historical significance as the site where Thomas Bruce, 7th Earl of Elgin briefly exhibited the Parthenon Marbles before selling them to the Crown, who now hold them in the British Museum. It was occupied by Prince William Frederick, Duke of Gloucester and Edinburgh from 1816 until his death in 1834, after which it was occupied by Prince George, Duke of Cambridge.

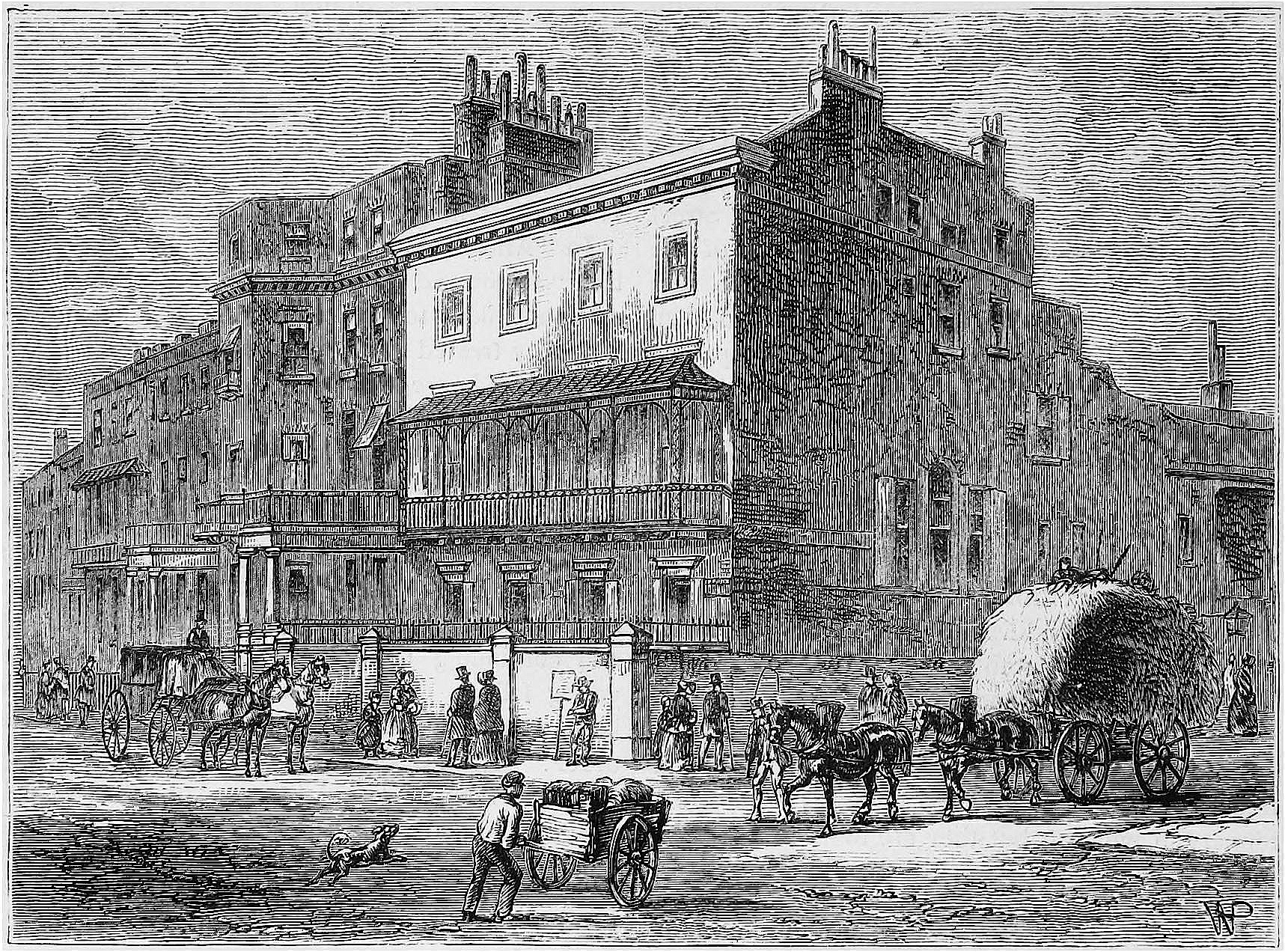
The original Gloucester House

The house was demolished in 1904 following the Duke of Cambridge's death. It was rebuilt as apartments by Sir Joseph Duveen in 1907. The first Hard Rock Cafe opened here in 1971.
