= Listed buildings in Newburgh, North Yorkshire =

Newburgh is a civil parish in the county of North Yorkshire, England. It contains 15 listed buildings that are recorded in the National Heritage List for England. Of these, one is listed at Grade I, the highest of the three grades, and the others are at Grade II, the lowest grade. The major building in the parish is Newburgh Priory, a country house, which is listed together with associated structures in the gardens and grounds. The other listed buildings include a house, two barns and a disused watermill.

== Key ==
Grade	Criteria
I	Buildings of exceptional interest, sometimes considered to be internationally important
II	Buildings of national importance and special interest

== Buildings ==
Name and location	Photograph	Date	Notes	Grade
Stone font 54.18105°N 1.16963°W	—	13th century	The font to the south of Newburgh Priory is in sandstone. It has a moulded octagonal base on a square step, on which is an octagonal stem with small attached shafts, and a moulded octagonal basin.	II
Barn west of Acorn Hill; 54.18442°N 1.15373°W		15th century (probable)	The barn is in limestone, and has a pantile roof with stone coping. There are two storeys and three bays. On the front is a porch, a doorway and slit vents, and at the rear is a segmental-arched opening.	II
Newburgh Priory; 54.18109°N 1.17031°W		16th century	A country house that has been altered and extended through the centuries. It is in sandstone, with roofs of pantile, plain tile, stone slate and Westmorland slate. There is an irregular plan, with three south ranges and lesser ranges to the rear. The south front has a plinth, three storeys, five bays, mullioned windows, a string course, a parapet and a pantile roof. There is a three-storey porch with Tuscan columns on the ground floor, a round-arched entrance, Ionic features on the middle floor and Corinthian features on the top floor.	I
Gates and gate piers opposite the Old Garden; 54.18010°N 1.17231°W	—	Early 18th century (probable)	The gate piers are in sandstone with square bases and five bands, pulvinated on all sides. Each pier has a plain capital and a bow-shaped capstone. The gates are in wrought iron, and have square bars with spear finials, and intermediate lower bars with inverted-V finials.	II
Gates and gate piers opposite the main gateway 54.18095°N 1.17278°W		Early 18th century (probable)	The gate piers are sandstone pilasters attached to a wall, with square bases and five bands, pulvinated on all sides. Each pier has a plain capital and a bow-shaped capstone. The gates are in wrought iron, and have square bars and intermediate lower bars with inverted-V finials. On the top are scrollwork volutes with leaves, and the closing bar has an acorn finial.	II
Gates, gate piers and flanking sections of park wall 54.17760°N 1.16834°W	—	Early 18th century (probable)	The gates are in wrought iron, and have square bars with twisted spear finials. The gate piers are in sandstone, with a cylindrical plan, on chamfered bases with moulded tops and bow-shaped capstones. The flanking walls are in sandstone with stone coping, the right wall containing a pilaster buttress with a stepped pyramidal cap.	II
North Lodge, South Lodge, gates and railings 54.18096°N 1.17249°W		Early 18th century	The gates at the entrance to the drive are in wrought iron, with an elliptical motif in mid-rail and scrollwork at the top, and an overthrow with a coat of arms and scrollwork. These are flanked by low sandstone walls with caned coping and wrought iron railings with square bars, obelisk finials and urns to the standards, and beyond these are lodges. These are in brick with banded rustication on a stone plinth, and sandstone dressings. Each lodge has two storeys and fronts of one and three bays, a floor band, a moulded cornice, and lead urns on the corners. On the ground floor is a doorway and sash window, all with a splayed lintel and a keystone, and the upper floor contain oculi with keystones.	II
Stable block, Newburgh Priory; 54.18167°N 1.17085°W	—	Early 18th century	The stable block is in sandstone, with rusticated quoins, and a hipped Welsh slate roof. There are two storeys and ranges of five and three bays, forming a quadrangle, later roofed over. In the centre of the south front is a doorway with pilasters, a fanlight, imposts, voussoirs and a tripartite keystone. The windows are sashes, with rusticated surrounds and flat arches of stepped voussoirs on the ground floor, and in architraves on the upper floor, and there are four oculi in architraves.	II
Walls, gate piers, gates and bothy in Old Garden; 54.18001°N 1.17452°W		Early 18th century (probable)	The walls enclosing the L-shaped garden are in sandstone and brick. At the entrance are paired wrought iron gates flanked by gate piers with a cylindrical plan, on chamfered bases with moulded tops and bow-shaped capstones. The bothy has a moulded eaves band and a hipped roof. There are two storeys and three bays, the middle bay projecting slightly, containing a doorway with an architrave, a fanlight, imposts and a tripartite keystone. Above it is a blocked Diocletian window, and the other windows are sashes.	II
Park Houses, ancillary buildings and wall 54.17554°N 1.14173°W	—	Early to mid-18th century (probable)	A gamekeeper's house and four outbuildings in sandstone, the house with a hipped tile roof, and the outbuildings with pantile roofs. The house has two storeys, three bays, and projecting single-storey five-sided wings with half-hipped roofs. There is a floor band and an eaves band, the central doorway is flanked by windows, and the other windows are casements. The four outbuildings are arranged as detached pavilions. In front of the house is a garden wall with an irregularly curved plan, in brick with stone coping, pilaster buttresses, and central gate piers.	II
Walls to Dog Kennel Garden and outbuildings 54.18168°N 1.17186°W	—	Early to mid-18th century (probable)	The walls enclosing the garden are in stone with brick lining, the east wall is in brick with stone dressings, and they have pilaster buttresses and stone coping. In the east wall is a wrought iron gate in a stone surround, with rusticated quoins and a five-part keystone. The outbuildings are on the outside of the north wall. The central building has two storeys, and contains four round-arched cart shed openings, the stone piers with imposts, and tripartite keystones. Above, there are depressed oculi in concave triangular panels, over which is a cornice and a parapet. The other buildings have a single storey.	II
Newburgh House; 54.18207°N 1.17256°W		18th century	The house is in sandstone with quoins and a stone slate roof. There are two storeys and eight bays. On the front is a projecting gabled porch, the windows are casements, and there are parts of an earlier frieze.	II
Sundial; 54.18095°N 1.17010°W	—	Mid-18th century	The sundial to the south of Newburgh Priory is in sandstone, and the dial is by Henry Hindley. It has a square base on two square steps, on which is a cylindrical stem with garlands and a fluted capital. The dial and gnomon are in bronze.	II
Barn, Home Farm; 54.18178°N 1.17335°W	—	1741	The barn is in sandstone with quoins and a hipped pantile roof. There are two storeys and five bays. In the centre are doors in a segmental-arched opening with voussoirs and a dated keystone, triangular-ended slit vents in two tiers, and five oculi on the upper floor. At the rear is a central segmental-arched opening.	II
Newburgh Mill; 54.18308°N 1.17570°W	—	Mid-19th century	A disused watermill with the remains of a 15th century mill at the rear. It is in brick with a tile roof, two storeys and a loft, and two bays. It contains doorways, horizontally-sliding sash windows and a sack hoist in the gable. The older mill is in sandstone with some brick, the roof has collapsed but a waterwheel and some machinery remains inside.	II
