= Robert Jones (died 1774) =

Welsh-born politician

Robert Jones (1704 – 17 February 1774) was a Welsh-born politician.

He was born in Wales and in 1743 had gone into partnership with a merchant in Gibraltar. He was appointed an Elder Brother of Trinity House for life in 1753 and elected a director of the East India Company in 1754 and 1765, serving in both cases for the conventional 3 years.

He was a Member of Parliament for Huntingdon from 15 April 1754 to 1768. At that time he was described as a wine merchant.

In July 1770 Jones bought Babraham in Cambridgeshire and demolished the Elizabethan manor house which had been built in the Italian style by Sir Horatio Pallavicini [Palavicino].

He died in 1774. He had married and had a daughter, but as his daughter had married J. W. Adeane without his approval, he made his grandson Robert Jones Adeane his heir.

Parliament of Great Britain
Preceded by John Montagu; Edward Montagu	Member of Parliament for Huntingdon; 1754 – 1774; With: Edward Montagu to 1768; Henry Seymour from 1768	Succeeded by Henry Seymour; Hon. William Augustus Montagu
