= Newburgh Priory =

Grade I listed building in North Yorkshire, England

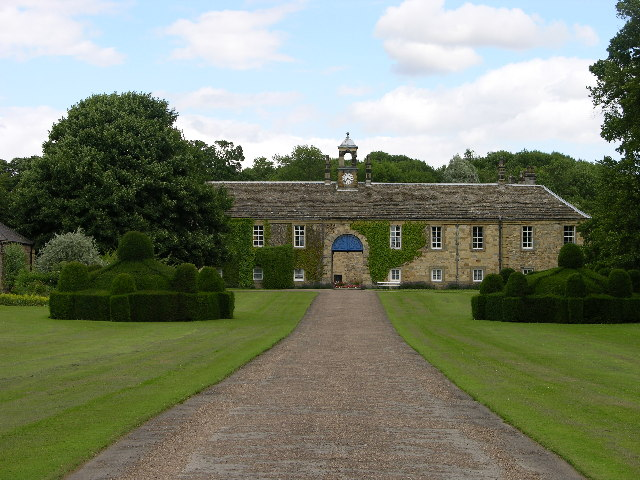
- Interactive map of the Newburgh Priory area

General information
- Type: English country house
- Location: Newburgh Priory, Coxwold, York, North Yorkshire, England
- Coordinates: 54°10′52″N 1°10′23″W
- Owner: Newburgh Priory Estate

Website
- www.newburghpriory.co.uk

Newburgh Priory is a Grade I listed Tudor building near Coxwold, North Yorkshire, England.

Originally a house of Augustinian canons, it was founded in 1145 and became a family home following the dissolution of the priory in 1538. The present house was built in the late 16th century, substantially remodelled by 4th Viscount Fauconberg 1725-45 and further restored in the 1960s. The 40 acres (16 ha) of grounds contain a water garden, walled garden, topiary yews and woodland walks. It is one of the rumoured burial sites of Oliver Cromwell.

The house was once the home of the Bellasis family and the seat of the Earls of Fauconberg until the death of Lady Charlotte Bellayse in 1825, when the property passed to the Wombwell family via the eldest son of her sister, Sir George Wombwell, 3rd Baronet.

== History ==
Roger de Mowbray founded the house of Augustinian canons in 1142–3 for canons of Bridlington first in a temporary settlement at Hook before the community could move in 1145 to Newburgh on lands originally granted by William the Conqueror to Robert de Mowbray. The Mowbrays continued to support the priory, as Roger's grandson, William de Mowbray, was also a benefactor and was buried there in about 1222. Little more is known of the priory from its founding until the Dissolution of the Monasteries in 1538 by Henry VIII, except that Margaret Tudor stayed a night there on 17 July 1503 as a guest of the prior during her progress to meet her husband James IV of Scotland.

Anthony de Bellasis, a royal chaplain, purchased the priory in 1539 from Henry VIII for £1,062. Anthony, with his brother Richard, had been responsible for the dissolution of not only Newburgh, but also eight other monasteries in the north of England. His nephew Sir William Bellasis (1524–1604) converted Newburgh into a private residence in 1546. He was appointed High Sheriff of Yorkshire for 1574–75. His eldest surviving son Henry was several times MP for Thirsk, once for Aldborough and High Sheriff for 1603–04. In 1611, he became one of the first baronets. His son Thomas Belasyse, 1st Viscount Fauconberg, also MP for Thirsk, succeeded him and took the title of Fauconberg when created a baron in 1627 (and viscount in 1643). The viscount's grandson Thomas married Oliver Cromwell's daughter, Mary, and was created Earl Fauconberg in 1689.

The property then descended through several generations to Henry Belasyse, 2nd Earl Fauconberg. On his death in 1802 the earldom became extinct and Newburgh was left to Lady Charlotte, his eldest daughter, who had married Thomas Wynn. He took the surname Belasyse and was High Sheriff in 1810–11. On Lady Charlotte's death in 1825 without male heir, the estate passed to George Wombwell, 3rd Baronet, the son of her sister Lady Anne, who had married Sir George Wombwell, 2nd Baronet in 1791. The 3rd Baronet's son, Sir George Orby Wombwell, 4th Baronet, was a survivor of the Charge of the Light Brigade and High Sheriff of Yorkshire for 1861. The house remains in the Wombwell family today.

Coal mining was prevalent in the area (as it was in other locations on the North York Moors) and collieries were in existence at Gilling East and Newburgh Priory. These workings finished in the 20th century.

== See also ==
- Grade I listed buildings in North Yorkshire (district)
- Listed buildings in Newburgh, North Yorkshire
