= George Orby Wombwell =

British baronet

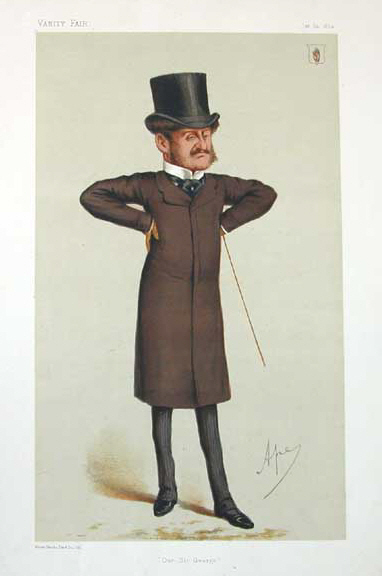
Caricature by Ape in Vanity Fair

Sir George Orby Wombwell, 4th Baronet (23 November 1832 – 16 October 1913) was a British baronet.

== Early life ==
Wombwell was born on 23 November 1832. He was the son of Sir George Wombwell, 3rd Baronet and educated at Eton College and Royal Military College, Sandhurst.

== Career ==
He joined the 17th Lancers in 1852 as a cornet and served as an aide-de-camp to Lord Cardigan. He was a survivor of the Charge of the Light Brigade. When he had reached the guns, his horse was killed under him and he was shortly after pulled off and taken prisoner, his sword and pistols being taken from him by some Russian Lancers. He managed to escape, catch another loose horse and ride back to the British lines, hotly pursued by Russians.

He retired from the Army as a lieutenant in 1855, when he inherited his title and Newburgh Priory, the old seat of the Belasyses, in Coxwold, North Yorkshire, on the death of his father. Included in this estate was Over Silton Manor, where Wombwell's initials (GOW) can still be seen on one of the manor cottages, and High House, at Thornton-on-the-Hill.

He was appointed High Sheriff of Yorkshire in 1861.

== Personal life ==
He married Lady Julia Sarah Alice Child-Villiers, daughter of George Child-Villiers, 6th Earl of Jersey and Julia Peel, on 3 September 1861. They had two sons, who both died on active service, and three daughters:

- George Wombwell (1865–1889), a lieutenant with the King's Royal Rifle Corps, died at Meerut in India
- Stephen Frederick Wombwell (1867–1901), a lieutenant in the Yorkshire Hussars, died of Enteric fever at Vryburg in South Africa during the Second Boer War while serving as a captain with the Imperial Yeomanry.
- Julia Georgiana Wombwell (b. 1862), who married firstly Vesey Dawson, 2nd Earl of Dartrey in 1890 and secondly, late in life, John St Aubyn, 2nd Baron St Levan.
- Mabel Caroline Wombwell (b.1863) who married Henry Robert Hohler.
- Cecilia Clementina Wombwell (b. 1864) who married William Menzies.

At his death he was the last surviving officer of the Charge of the Light Brigade and was buried in Coxwold churchyard. His title and 12,000 acre estate passed to his younger brother Henry Herbert Wombwell.

Coat of arms of George Orby Wombwell
| Crest A unicorn's head couped Argent. Escutcheon Gules a bend between six unicorns' heads couped Argent. Motto In Well Beware |

== Picture of 4th Baronet ==
- Painting of Sir George Wombwell, 4th Baronet

Baronetage of Great Britain
| Preceded by George Wombwell | Baronet (of Wombwell); 1855–1913 | Succeeded by Henry Wombwell |
