= St Faith's Chapel, Westminster =

St Faith’s Chapel
- Chapel of Saint Faith
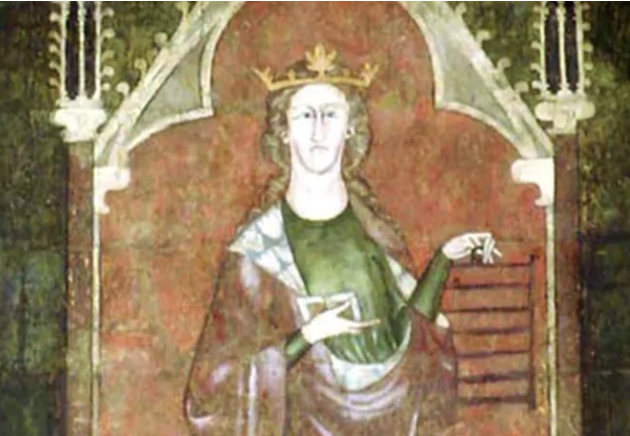
- Wall painting of St Faith
- St Faith’s Chapel
- Location: Westminster Abbey, London, England
- Denomination: Church of England (formerly Benedictine)

History
- Status: Chapel / Vestry / Sacristy
- Dedication: Saint Faith

St Faith’s Chapel (or the Chapel of Saint Faith) is a medieval chapel adjoining the south transept of Westminster Abbey in London. It dates from the mid-13th century and has served various liturgical and functional roles, including sacristy, vestry, and chapel. It is noted for its decorative features, including a rare medieval wall painting of St Faith dating to c1290-1300, and medieval floor tiles.

== Location and Architecture ==
St Faith’s Chapel is situated beyond the south wall of the south transept of Westminster Abbey, abutting the transept and cloister precincts. The chapel is built in Gothic style, roughly c. 1250, with characteristic features such as Purbeck marble shafts and corbels, rib vaulting, blank arcading, and 13th-century floor tiles. The structure includes two bays to the west and one to the east. It has thick walls, about 4 ft (≈ 1.2 m), and measures approximately 58 ft long by 15 ft wide (≈ 17.7 m × 4.6 m) according to architectural survey.

Former chaplain William Booth held Compline services at St Faith's on Friday evenings in the 1980s for boys at Westminster School.

=== Medieval Wall Painting of St Faith ===
The chapel is notable for an unusually well preserved medieval wall painting; the six foot high crowned figure of the Fourth century martyr St Faith, who wears a green tunic with a rose coloured mantle against a vermilion background. The painting is in oil and dates to around 1290-1300. A Latin inscription can be translated as "From the burden of my sore transgressions sweet virgin deliver me; make my peace with Christ and blot out my iniquity." St Faith holds a gridiron, the symbol of her martyrdom. A tiny Benedictine monk kneels to one side.

== See also ==
- Westminster Abbey
