= Thomas Rawlinson (died 1769) =

Sir Thomas Rawlinson (died 1769) of Stowlangtoft, Suffolk, was Lord Mayor of London in 1753.

Rawlinson was the son of Rev. Robert Rawlinson of Charlwood, Surrey. His grandfather, Daniel Rawlinson, was the cousin of Sir Thomas Rawlinson who was also Lord Mayor in 1705. He married his first cousin, Dorothea Ray, daughter of Rev. Richard Ray of Haughley, Suffolk who was born on 31 July 1704.

Rawlinson was elected alderman of Broad Street ward in 1746, and Sheriff of London and Middlesex on 21 June 1748. He became a member of the Grocer's Company, and served the office of master. On the death of Edward Ironside, Lord Mayor, on 27 November 1753 soon after accession to office, Rawlinson was elected lord mayor for the remainder of the year. He was knighted in 1760, was colonel of the Red regiment of trained bands, and was a prominent member of the Honourable Artillery Company, to which he presented in 1763 a ‘sheet of red colours.’ He was elected vice-president of the company in July 1766 (Raikes, Hist. of the Hon. Artillery Company, ii. 10, 13).

Rawlinson lived latterly at his estate of Stowlangtoft Hall in Suffolk, which he bought in 1760. He died at his house in Fenchurch Street on 3 December 1769, and his will, dated 3 August 1769, was proved on 18 December. He was buried at Haughley, Suffolk. His wife had died on 12 June 1743. His only daughter, Susannah, married Sir George Wombwell, 1st Baronet. A son Sir Walter inherited his Suffolk estates.

Civic offices
Preceded by Edward Ironside	Lord Mayor of London; 1753–1754	Succeeded by Stephen Theodore Janssen
