= Wombwell baronets =

Title in the Baronetage of Great Britain

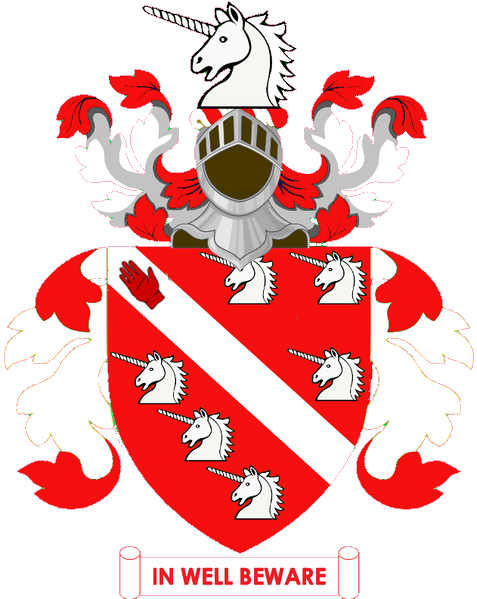
- Crest: A unicorn's head couped Argent.
- Shield: Gules, a bend between six unicorns' heads couped Argent.
- Motto: In Well Beware

The Wombwell baronetcy, of Wombwell in the County of York, is a title in the Baronetage of Great Britain. It was created on 26 August 1778 for George Wombwell, Chairman of the Honourable East India Company and Member of Parliament for Huntingdon.

The family surname is pronounced "Woomwell". The 3rd Baronet inherited Newburgh Priory in 1825 from his aunt, Lady Charlotte Belasyse. The 4th Baronet fought in the Crimean War, taking part in the Charge of the Light Brigade. In 1861 he served as High Sheriff of Yorkshire.

As of 2026 the title is marked dormant on the Official Roll.

== Wombwell baronets, of Wombwell (1778) ==
- Sir George Wombwell, 1st Baronet (1734–1780)
- Sir George Wombwell, 2nd Baronet (1769–1846)
- Sir George Wombwell, 3rd Baronet (1792–1855)
- Sir George Orby Wombwell, 4th Baronet (1832–1913)
- Sir Henry Herbert Wombwell, 5th Baronet (1840–1926)
- Sir (Frederick) Philip Alfred William Wombwell, 6th Baronet (1910–1977)
- George Philip Frederick Wombwell, presumed 7th Baronet (born 1949), succeeded his father in 1977, but does not appear on the Official Roll of the Baronetage.

The heir apparent is Stephen Philip Henry Wombwell (born 1977), the presumed Baronet's only son.

== Notes ==
Baronetage of Great Britain
Preceded by Heron baronets	Wombwell baronets of Wombwell; 26 August 1778	Succeeded by James baronets
