= Sir George Wombwell, 1st Baronet =

Sir George Wombwell, Bt

Member of Parliament for Huntingdon
- In office 1774–1780 Serving with William Augustus Montagu, The Lord Mulgrave
- Preceded by: Robert Jones; William Augustus Montagu
- Succeeded by: The Lord Mulgrave; Hugh Palliser

Personal details
- Born: 11 June 1734
- Died: 2 November 1780 (aged 46)
- Spouse: Susanna Rawlinson
- Children: 3, including George
- Parent(s): Roger Wombwell; Mary Chadwick

Sir George Wombwell, 1st Baronet (11 June 1734 – 2 November 1780) was Chairman of the Honourable East India Company and a Member of Parliament.

== Early life ==
Wombwell was baptised 11 June 1734. He was the eldest son of Roger Wombwell of Barnsley, Yorkshire, a merchant, and Mary (née Chadwick) Wombwell. His father died at sea en route to Gibraltar in 1740.

His maternal grandfather was Francis Chadwick and his paternal grandparents were John Wombwell, a merchant at Alicante, and Elizabeth (née Nottingham) Wombwell.

== Career ==
He went into partnership with his uncle in the London company of George Wombwell, sen. and jun. In the British East India Company he was connected with Lord Sandwich, and with his support was elected director from 1766 to 1769, again from 1775 to 17777 and chairman from 1777 to 1779.

He was elected Member of Parliament (MP) for Huntingdon in 1774, sitting until 1780. He was created a baronet in 1778.

== Personal life ==
On 4 June 1765, Wombwell married Susanna Rawlinson, the daughter of Sir Thomas Rawlinson, Lord Mayor of London. They had a son and two daughters including:

- Susanna Wombwell, who married Col. Edward Roche, son of Edmund Roche and Barbara (née Hennessy) Roche, in 1781.
- Sir George Wombwell, 2nd Baronet (1769–1846), who married Lady Anne Belasyse, a daughter of Henry Belasyse, 2nd Earl Fauconberg, in 1791. After her death in 1808, he married Eliza Little, daughter of T. E. Little, in 1813.

Sir George died on 2 November 1780 and was succeeded in the baronetcy by his only son, George.

== Coat of arms ==
Coat of arms of Sir George Wombwell, 1st Baronet
Crest A unicorn's head couped Argent. Escutcheon Gules a bend between six unicorns' heads couped Argent. Motto In Well Beware

Parliament of Great Britain
Preceded by Robert Jones; William Augustus Montagu	Member of Parliament for Huntingdon; 1774–1780; With: William Augustus Montagu 1774–1776; The Lord Mulgrave 1776–1780	Succeeded by The Lord Mulgrave; Hugh Palliser
Baronetage of Great Britain
New creation	Baronet (of Wombwell); 1778–1780	Succeeded by George Wombwell
