= Zachary Selig =

American painter (1949–2016)

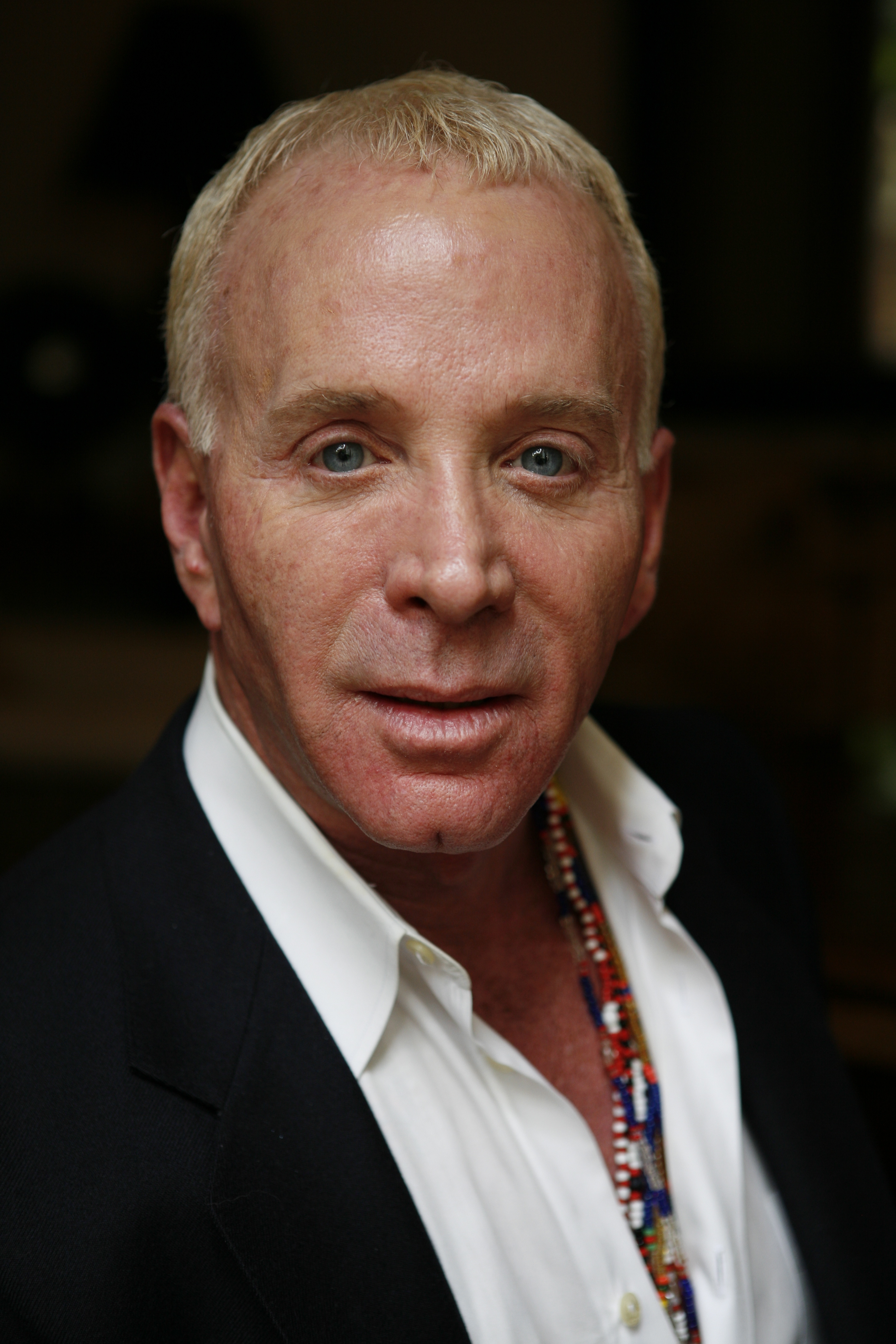
- Zachary Selig in 2007
- Born: Zachary Jay Selig; November 24, 1949; Seguin, Texas, United States
- Died: June 30, 2016 (aged 66); Mexico City, Mexico
- Education: Parson's School of Design, Arts Students League of New York City, New York School of Interior Design, École des Beaux Arts
- Known for: Painting, Author, Interior design, Spiritist
- Notable work: The Relaxatia Codex, Enchanted Landscapes, The Violet Flame Transmuting Earth, Orourboros
- Movement: Magic realism

Zachary Selig (24 November 1949 – 30 June 2016) was an American artist, author, interior designer and celebrity spiritist.

== Life ==
Selig was the son of New York born American steel manufacturing industrialist and economic advisor Marvin Selig and Eleanor Berg Selig, a Texas commissioner of mental health under 3 United States presidents. He was born in Seguin, Texas, and later lived with his mother's family in the Hudson River Valley and in Manhattan. Selig's mother's cousin and wife became Selig's surrogate parents, who guided him into an international world of art and accomplished artists that built the foundation of his career. Another maternal family relation, New York publicist Lee Goode Kingsley, established Selig's relations in the art world. Charles Revson, his mother's cousin and co-founder of Revlon, invited 17-year-old Selig on board the Revlon yacht Ultima II in Acapulco and introduced him to many guests that later became his lifetime friends, including Merle Oberon, Babe Paley, Gloria Guinness, Dolores del Río, Ahmet Ertegun and his wife Mica, Chito and Jeanette Jaffe de Longoria, Prince Egon von Fürstenberg, jewelry designer Aldo Cipullo, Vogue magazine editor DD Ryan, and publicist Eleanor Lambert.

Selig died of heart failure in 2016 after dinner and enjoying the company of dear friends in Mexico City. He had been residing in San Miguel de Allende in his adopted home of Mexico.

== Education ==
Selig was tutored in drawing and oil painting from the age of 5 in Texas, and spoke fluent Spanish by age 12. He began his esoteric anthropological studies in Mesoamerican Anthropology at the age of 16 at the University of the Americas in Mexico City, Mexico with German professor Baron Alexander von Wuthenau, who wrote 5 books on the racial origins of man in Mesoamerica.

His formal education in the arts began with painting at the Colorado Academy in Denver, Colorado. He then studied at Transylvania University in Lexington, Kentucky and at the University of Houston, the Parsons School of Design, the Art Students League of New York, the New York School of Interior Design and oil painting at the École des Beaux Arts in Paris.

Selig was an apprentice of Mexican artist Pedro Friedeberg, who also uses Tantras and Mesoamerican cultural references in his works of art. In 1970, Friedeberg introduced Selig to his mentor, artist Bridget Bate Tichenor, in Mexico City. Tichenor, a painter in the magic realism school, spiritually adopted Selig and he was Tichenor's protégé until her death in 1990.

== Career ==
His first publication as author and illustrator was the bestselling Kundalini Awakening – A Gentle Guide to Chakra Activation and Spiritual Growth.

Selig was a magic realist painter. His skills as a spiritist and painter led to the creation of a unique codex titled Relaxatia, an ancient Solar Kundalini paradigm that he rediscovered through Purépecha Nahaulli high priests in Zihuatanejo, Guerrero, Mexico. It is a codex of the human chakra system and the solar light spectrum, designed to activate Kundalini in color-coded paintings. Selig made commissioned portraits and works of art for Isabel Goldsmith-Patiño, eldest daughter of Sir James Goldsmith and granddaughter of Antenor Patiño, Prince Egon von Fürstenberg, Catherine Oxenberg and Kelly Le Brock, among others. Exhibitions featuring Selig's paintings include "100th Anniversary of Hollywood - Portraits of the Stars" held at the Otis College of Art and Design in Los Angeles, and "Organic Landscapes" sponsored by Versace in Beverly Hills.

An E! True Hollywood Story featured Selig and his close friendship with actress and fashion model Margaux Hemingway. He helped launch Hemingway's career in the 1970s, and established the initial marketing and public relations format that helped make her a global celebrity, introducing Hemingway to a circle of fashion professionals in New York City that included photographer Francesco Scavullo, designer Halston, Vogue editor Francis Stein and Marian McEvoy, a fashion editor for Women's Wear Daily. Selig and Hemingway privately studied Solar Kundalini, yoga and meditation together at the Hemingway family's property in Ketchum, Idaho, adjacent to Sun Valley. Several years later, Hemingway made Selig the creative director for her 1990 Playboy magazine cover and pictorial by photographer Arny Freytag that was shot in Belize.

Selig was a Yoruba priest and spiritual consultant. He was the consultant of paranormal phenomena for director Tobe Hooper and the production of Spontaneous Combustion (1990), a film about psychokinetic powers. It received a nomination for best film in the 1991 Fantasporto International Fantasy Film Awards. Selig performed an Afro-Cuban spiritual cleansing ritual in the 2013 documentary A Journey to Planet Sanity, a film about psychics and the paranormal.

His background as an artist, spiritist and his trompe-l'œil painting were used in his work as interior designer. He trained with the New York City interior design team of Bunny Mellon and Cartier designer Aldo Cipullo, where he mastered trompe-l'œil painting techniques. His first commissioned trompe-l'œil interiors were showcased in a 1971 House Beautiful article featuring Cipullo's residence in Manhattan. In 1977, Selig worked in fashion design and created the MU clothing collection in Mexico City, which was produced by artisans in Zihuatanejo. In California, he restored and decorated a suite of interiors in the Villa d'Este, a historic Italianate courtyard villa that was built circa 1928 for Cecil B. DeMille in West Hollywood. The early 20th-century Italian Renaissance style building, with its elaborately painted portico, ceiling decorations and frieze, was a former residence of silent film star Pola Negri. Selig specialized in Sekhem, utilizing an 8,000-year-old pre-dynastic Egyptian Neteru design theurgy with classical and modern design elements in the art of interior design harmonics.

Selig contributed to Maureen Orth's book Vulgar Favors about the death of Gianni Versace. Selig had a home in Miami Beach, Florida, from 1996 to 2004, and was associated with Versace's circle of friends, spending the Sunday before Versace's death with him and a group on the 11th Street Beach in South Beach.

In 2011, Selig contributed the first detailed biographical data of Bridget Bate Tichenor's mother Vera Bate Lombardi and her relationship to Coco Chanel for the book Sleeping With The Enemy – Chanel's Secret War by Hal Vaughan. Artist Pedro Friedeberg dedicated a chapter on Zachary Selig in his book of memoirs De Vacaciones Por La Vida (Holiday For Life) with eight friends that included Salvador Dalí, Leonora Carrington, Kati Horna, Tamara de Lempicka, Mathias Goeritz, Edward James, and Bridget Bate Tichenor.

His artwork was represented by Friedeberg Fine Arts in the USA, France, United Kingdom and Mexico. Friedeberg's 2013 Too Much is Not Enough exhibition at the Casa Diana Gallery in San Miguel de Allende featured Selig's Spiritual Guides series of paintings. Selig's artwork was included in Friedeberg's 2014 Manos por Mexico exhibition at the Franz Mayer Museum, where it drew over 18,000 visitors; it was later exhibited at the Pinacoteca de Nuevo León in Monterrey. In 2014, a portrait painted by Selig was featured in the exhibition Joan Quinn Captured at the Brand Library and Art Center in Glendale, California. A solo exhibition of Selig's latest Magic Talismans series of paintings opened on April 1, 2015, at the Sollano 16 gallery in San Miguel de Allende, Guanajuato, Mexico. In September 2015, the Museo de Arte Moderno in Mexico City displayed Selig's work in its 10-year anniversary exhibition 10 años de "Arte Vivo". An exhibition of Selig's Magic Talismans paintings was presented at Art Basel 2015 in Miami Beach by the Bertil Bernhardt Design and Art Gallery.

== Painting technique ==
Selig's art was inspired and influenced by Mexican culture, along with Meso-American magical talisman symbols and mysticism, as were his European mentors who were Mexican expatriate Surrealists. Selig painted with an oil paint medium and used an easel. At age 20, the artist Bridget Bate TIchenor taught him an Italian 16th-century painting technique that she had learned from artist Paul Cadmus in 1944. The labor-intensive painting formula involved multiple transparent thin oil glazes, building layers applied with #000 sable brushes on egg-shell gesso, resulting in a deep, detailed and jewel-like three-dimensional finish. Mexican Surrealist Pedro Friedeberg introduced Selig to esotericism and shared many of his creative interests, helping build the foundation of Selig's career as an artist. Friedeberg guided Selig's perspective drawing and use of magical cosmograms and symbols. Selig's artwork can be considered both Surrealist and Magic Realist, but it does not adhere solely to the principles of Surrealism. His paintings juxtaposed spiritual themes that reflected his extensive 40-year background as an artist and spiritist.
