= Lauren Hutton =

American model and actress (born 1943)

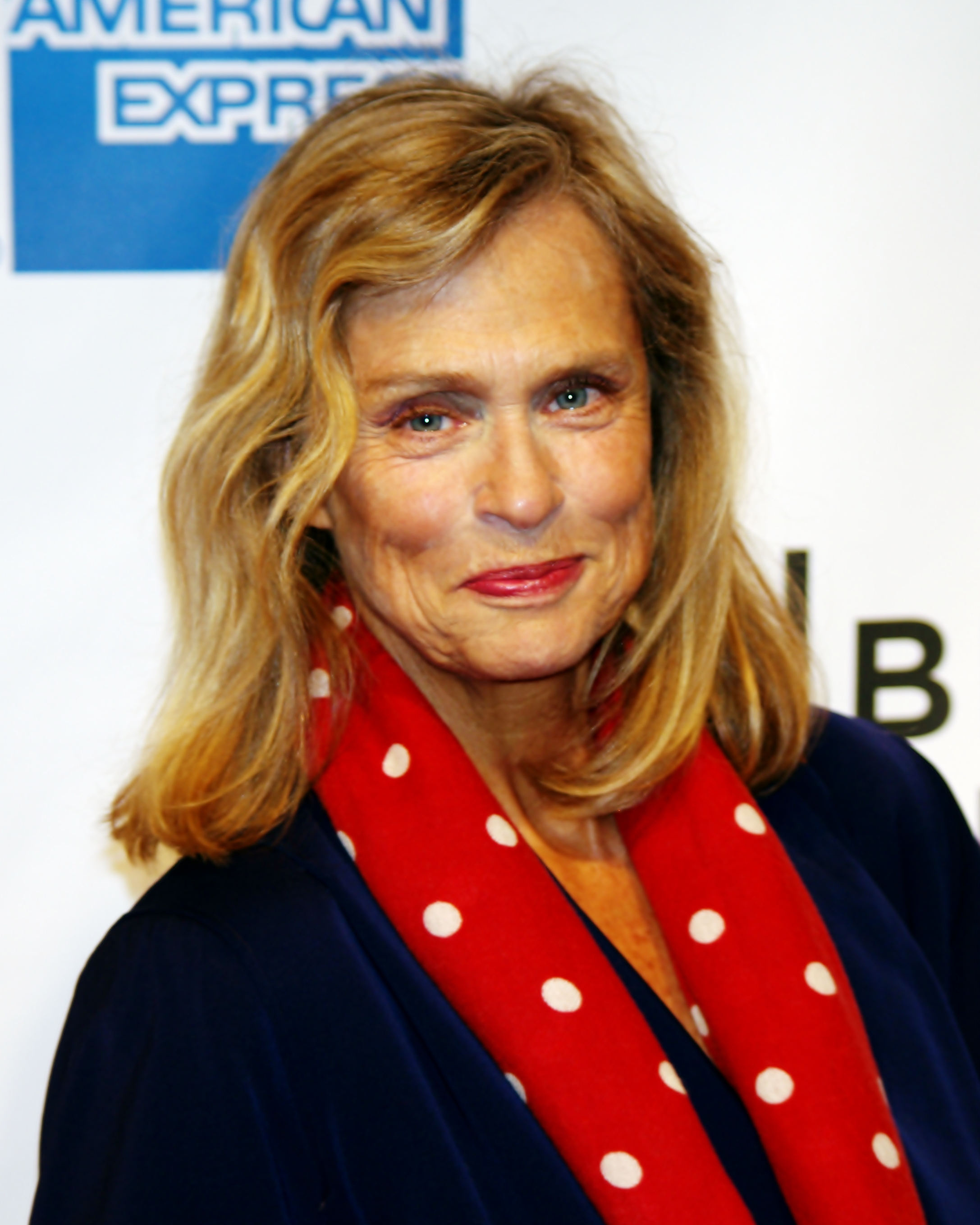
- Hutton in 2011
- Born: Mary Laurence Hutton; November 17, 1943 (age 83); Charleston, South Carolina, U.S.
- Education: Tulane University
- Occupations: Model, actress
- Years active: 1963–present
- Height: 5 ft 7 in (1.70 m)
- Partner: Robert Williamson (1964–1997)

Lauren Hutton (born Mary Laurence Hutton; November 17, 1943) is an American model and actress. Born and raised in the southern United States, Hutton relocated to New York City in her early adulthood to begin a modeling career. Though she was initially dismissed by agents for a signature gap in her teeth, Hutton signed a modeling contract with Revlon in 1973, which at the time was the biggest contract in the history of the modeling industry.

Over her career, Hutton has worked both as a model and an actress, making her film debut in the sports drama Paper Lion in 1968, opposite Alan Alda. She also played central roles in The Gambler (1974) and American Gigolo (1980), and later appeared on television in the network series Paper Dolls, Falcon Crest, Central Park West and Nip/Tuck.

Hutton has continued to model into her seventies, appearing in numerous advertising campaigns for H&M, Lord and Taylor, and Alexander Wang, and performed on the runway for Tom Ford's spring 2012 collection, as well as for Bottega Veneta at the 2016 New York Fashion Week.

== Early life ==
Hutton was born Mary Laurence Hutton on November 17, 1943, in Charleston, South Carolina, to Lawrence Bryan Hutton and Minnie (Behrens) Hutton. Her father was a native of Oxford, Mississippi, where he grew up next-door to William Faulkner, and was stationed with the U.S. Army Air Corps in England, during World War II when Lauren was born.

After the war, Hutton's mother divorced her father in 1945, and she relocated to Miami, and later, Tampa, Florida. Hutton spent the remainder of her early life in Tampa, not knowing her father, who died June 24, 1956, from a heart attack at age 37. He was working as a farm editor for The Cotton Trade Journal, living in Shelby, Tennessee, with his second wife, Mary Elizabeth (Everette) Hutton. He is buried at Oxford Memorial Cemetery, in Oxford, Mississippi. "Never meeting my father was the most painful thing in my life," Hutton said in 1996. "I look just like him and I'm named for him, but all I have are these two books of his letters and drawings from the war. The day of my birth he wrote and told me about our ancestors, what he thought was important in the world, what books I should read and what he wanted for me."

After her mother remarried in 1949, Hutton took the surname "Hall", although her stepfather never formally adopted her. She graduated from Chamberlain High School in Tampa in 1961 and was among the first students to attend the University of South Florida in 1961. Hutton later relocated with former Tampa disc jockey Pat Chamburs, a war veteran 19 years her senior who had lost a leg in a kamikaze attack, to New York City, where she worked as a "Bunny" waitress at the Playboy Club, at which time she made her first appearance on camera as a decoy contestant on To Tell The Truth in 1963. The pair lived in Europe, the Bahamas and later moved to New Orleans, where she attended Newcomb College, then a coordinate college within Tulane University, and graduated with a Bachelor of Arts degree in 1964.

== Career ==
=== 1964–2007: Early work and Revlon ===
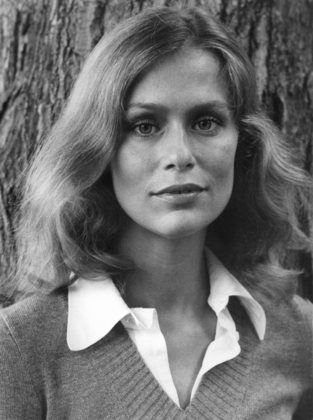
Hutton in a 1974 publicity photo for The Gambler

Hutton returned to New York by herself in the mid-1960s, changed her name to "Lauren Hutton" and embarked on a career as a model. She was advised by agents to hide the gap in her teeth and tried using morticians' wax to cover the gap; she later used a cap to hide it, which she would often swallow, laugh out, or misplace. Hutton eventually retained this "imperfection" and the All Movie Guide stated that it "gave her on-camera persona a down-home sensibility that other, more ethereal models lacked." She continued to book modeling jobs, and appeared in a Chanel advertisement in 1968, photographed by Richard Avedon.

In 1973, Hutton signed a contract with Revlon cosmetics, worth US$250,000 a year for 20 days' work (equivalent to $1,810,000 in 2025), a professional relationship that lasted for 10 years. At the time, it was the biggest contract in the history of the modeling industry. Hutton's initial contract with Revlon involved representation of the Ultima II brand. Twenty years later, she signed a new contract with Revlon to be the spokeswoman for Results, a collection of corrective moisturizing treatments. Her contract with Revlon garnered Hutton further modeling work, and she became a "cover girl," appearing on the front cover of Vogue a record 26 times.

In 1982, Hutton appeared in two Pepsi Light commercials, one where she strips down to her one-piece swimsuit and dives into a swimming pool and one where she gets all wet when the shower turns on by itself.

In 1988, she appeared in a campaign for Barneys New York, and in 1993, performed as a runway model for designer Calvin Klein, to which the New York Times responded by publishing an article stating that Hutton was "just as good as the current flock of fledglings." In 1997, Hutton became a brand ambassador and appeared in multiple advertising campaigns for the Australian department store David Jones. In 2001, she was replaced by Megan Gale.

Hutton was presented on the November 1999 Millennium cover of American Vogue as one of the "Modern Muses". Following her recovery from a motorcycle accident in 2000, she became the spokeswoman for her own signature brand of cosmetics, "Lauren Hutton's Good Stuff", a line of cosmetic products for mature women. The brand was sold primarily in the USA, but was also available through secondary distribution channels throughout Europe and South America.

In October 2005, Hutton was interviewed on ABC's Good Morning America program in relation to the future release of an edition of Big magazine that was entirely dedicated to Hutton's career and included eight pages of nude photos. Hutton agreed to pose nude for the feature, titled "Lauren Hutton: The Beautiful Persists", when she was 61 years old, and explained to GMA:

I want them [women] not to be ashamed of who they are when they're in bed. Society has told us to be ashamed ... The really important [thing] is that women understand not to listen to a 2,000-year-old patriarchal society.

Hutton, who is supposedly one of four women offered US$1 million by Larry Flynt to pose nude, also explained that she first sought permission from her fourteen godchildren, who told her the photographs would be "inspirational".

=== 2008–2021: Runway and campaigns ===
In 2008, Hutton accepted an offer from Mary-Kate and Ashley Olsen to appear in the lookbook for their clothing line The Row, and explained in 2010: "I saw the clothes, and they were wonderful, real simple, minimalist designs... Ash had a place on the beach, so we did it at her place... And they would dance on the deck, and I would do what they were doing. And it was good." During the same year, retailer Mango launched a fashion collection inspired by Hutton's personal style, and she also appeared in Lord & Taylor's fall/winter and spring collections. The following year, she was featured in a campaign by Badgley Mischka.

Alongside celebrity models such as Iman and Paulina Porizkova, Hutton was one of the panel members in a roundtable discussion for the "Model as Muse: Embodying Fashion" gala, an annual event organized by the Metropolitan Museum's Costume Institute. Held in May 2009, the discussion occurred at New York's Minetta Tavern. Photographs of Hutton were also displayed as part of the exhibition The Model as Muse: Embodying Fashion that was taking place at The Met and acknowledged the significance of fashion models.

A third-party licensing brand of the Jim Henson Company, Henson Independent Properties (HIP), entered into an agreement with Hutton in November 2010 to act as the global licensing agent for her merchandising program. Targeted at women over 40 years of age, the brand launched products such as eyewear, handbags, and luggage, and home décor, globally in 2012. HIP's senior vice president at the time referred to Hutton as a "trailblazer" in the press release. Hutton was also a guest judge on the fashion designer reality television show Project Runway in 2010, also appearing in advertisements for J.Crew the same year.

In 2011, Hutton walked the runway for Tom Ford's spring 2012 collection, and was selected as the house model for the Alexis Bittar jewelry brand. Designer Alexis Bittar, a recipient of the CFDA Accessory Designer of the Year award, personally selected Hutton after choosing Joan Collins for the previous year. Hutton stated that Bittar's jewelry is "like art and still doesn't look like anything I have ever seen." Her photos for the campaign were shot by Jack Pierson. Hutton then appeared alongside people such as actress Shuya Chang and Annie Lennox's daughter Tali Lennox in the spring 2011 ad campaign for the Club Monaco retail brand. The lookbook was photographed by Ryan McGinley, the youngest photographer to be featured in the Whitney Museum of American Art at the time of the Club Monaco shoot.

She appeared in a campaign title "Do Something" by designer Alexander Wang, alongside Rod Stewart and Kate Moss in 2015, and was featured in Tod's Timeless Icons retrospective in 2016. She was also featured in H&M's fall 2016 video campaign alongside Hari Nef. In 2016 for Milan Fashion Week, Hutton walked the runway for Bottega Veneta's Spring 2017 show.

== Film and television career ==
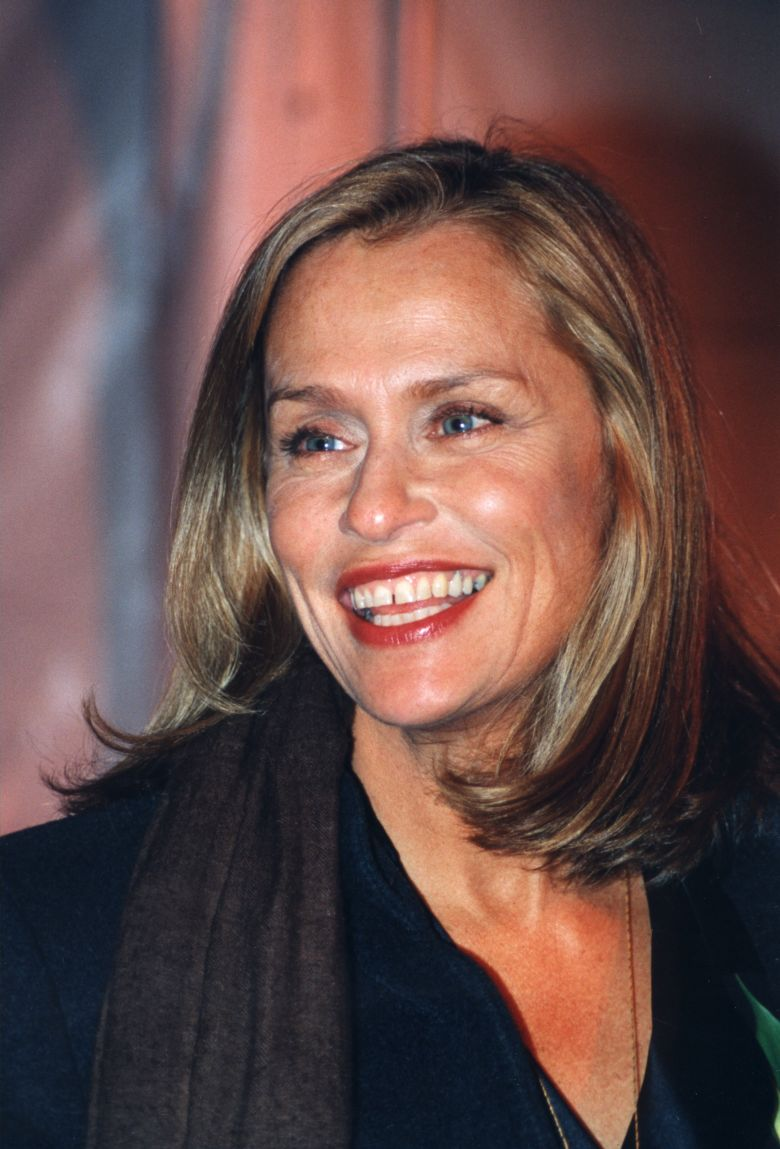
Hutton in 1997

Before becoming an established model, Hutton made her film debut in Paper Lion (1968), and later notices for her performances in James Toback's The Gambler (1974), opposite James Caan.

She also starred in John Carpenter's TV movie Someone's Watching Me! (1978) and played the female lead in American Gigolo (1980). She went on to appear in Lassiter (1984), Once Bitten (1985), a modest hit, and Guilty as Charged (1992). She also made an uncredited cameo appearance as a celebrity party guest in the 1985 film Perfect.

In 1984, Hutton joined the cast of the short-lived primetime soap drama, Paper Dolls, which co-starred Lloyd Bridges and Morgan Fairchild. In 1986, she co-starred in the lavish TV miniseries Sins, which starred Joan Collins, and also starred opposite Stacy Keach in The Return of Mike Hammer TV movie. In the spring of 1987, Hutton had a starring role opposite William Devane in a sci-fi themed CBS Movie of the Week titled Timestalkers, and later that year guest-starred in the primetime soap drama Falcon Crest for several episodes.

In 1995, Hutton was cast in the CBS soap opera Central Park West, playing the wealthy socialite Linda Fairchild until the show was canceled the following year.

The following year, Hutton's late-night talk show for Turner Original Production, Lauren Hutton and..., debuted and ran until 1997. Hutton's partner at the time, Luca Babini, was the director, set designer and post-production supervisor of the talk show, and the couple founded Lula Productions as part of their arrangement with the Turner media company.

Hutton appeared in her first feature film in two decades with the 2009 release of The Joneses, in which she starred alongside David Duchovny and Demi Moore. When asked about her decision to play the head of a marketing company, Hutton explained:

I thought it was an extraordinary script, and a great idea, this stealth marketing. My character had worked with Demi [Moore] when Demi was an 18-year-old, having her sitting on bar stools at expensive bars and ordering certain champagnes and certain cigarettes. And now she has little pods of these families all over the country, and she's got them in rented houses for a year at a whack to heist all the neighbors. And I thought that capitalism could be as vicious as anything they ever came up with in the U.S.S.R. And certainly to some degree, we do seem to be involved in that, don't we? All these people who do double jobs of acting were on red carpets wearing diamonds and $20,000 dresses, and that's a full-time job. I never did that.

== Personal life ==
Hutton was involved in a 37-year-long relationship with her manager Bob Williamson, who died in 1997. Williamson squandered some $30 million of her money. Hutton said she was looking for a father figure:

I didn't have a father, and I wanted to be a child with a protector. I'd never seen a shrink, and there was a psychological situation that clearly needed to be addressed. But, you know, I wanted to see the world and how people lived and think about who are we, how are we, why is the world? And Bob did that for me.

Hutton met Luca Babini on a film set in 1991 and he said of the relationship's development in 1996: "I was coming out of a divorce, and she became like a sister to me. Then I fell in love with her. And I loved her feet, which say so much about a person." Babini also referred to Hutton as "accessible and down to earth," and described her as a person with "very clear opinions" that she was willing to express.

In October 2000, Hutton joined a motorbike group, which included actors Dennis Hopper, Laurence Fishburne and Jeremy Irons, to celebrate "The Art of the Motorcycle" exhibit at the Hermitage-Guggenheim museum in Las Vegas, Nevada. Prior to the journey, Hutton informed the Las Vegas Review-Journal: "I love the feeling of being a naked egg atop that throbbing steel. You feel vulnerable—but so alive." En route, while going over 100 miles (160 km) per hour, Hutton crashed near Hoover Dam, on the border between the US states of Arizona and Nevada, and suffered multiple leg fractures, a fractured arm, broken ribs and sternum, and a punctured lung. Hopper later recalled from before the start of the ride: "She had on a little helmet, sort of tied under her chin. It was cute. And Jeremy [Irons] came up to her and said, 'You got to be kidding.' He took it off her and gave her a proper helmet."

Hutton is the original vice-president of the Guggenheim Museum Motorcycle Club, and, in 2003, was a board member of the National Museum of Women in Arts in Washington, D.C., US.

In July 2013, Hutton revealed that she was in the process of writing her memoir, which may be titled Smile, and also explained the value of traveling and exploration in her life thus far: "whenever I came back from Africa or the Antarctic, head swelling with the beauty of it all, I found I was loving life again. You look different because of everything that has gone on inside of you..."

She has lived in NoHo in Manhattan in New York City. As of 2004, Hutton resided mainly in Taos, New Mexico, where she owns a prefab steel home.

== Scuba diving ==
Hutton was inducted into the Women Divers Hall of Fame in 2007 as a conservationist and scuba advocate. She started scuba diving in the 1960s, and has dived worldwide. She used her status as a celebrity to promote marine conservation, particularly of sharks, and supports the Shark Research Institute. She has also supported the recreational activity of scuba diving in interviews, articles and personal appearances at dive shows.

== Filmography ==
=== Film ===
Year	Title	Role	Notes
1968	Paper Lion	Kate	
1970	Pieces of Dreams	Pamela Gibson	
1970	Little Fauss and Big Halsy	Rita Nebraska	
1971	My Name Is Rocco Papaleo	Jenny	
1974	The Gambler	Billie	
1976	Gator	Aggie Maybank	
1976	Welcome to L.A.	Nona Bruce	
1977	Viva Knievel!	Kate Morgan	
1978	A Wedding	Florence Farmer	
1980	American Gigolo	Michelle	
1981	Zorro, The Gay Blade	Charlotte Taylor Wilson	
1981	Paternity	Jenny Lofton	
1982	All Fired Up	Jane	
1982	Hécate	Clothilde de Watteville	
1983	Starflight One	Erica	made-for-TV
1984	Lassiter	Kari Von Fursten	
1985	Once Bitten	Countess	
1986	Flagrant désir	Marlene Bell-Ferguson	
1987	Timestalkers	Georgia Crawford	
1987	Malone	Jamie	
1988	Run for Your Life	Sarah Forsythe	
1989	Forbidden Sun	Mrs. Lake	
1990	Fear	Jessica Moreau	
1991	Missing Pieces	Jennifer	
1991	Millions	Cristina Ferretti	
1991	Guilty as Charged	Liz	
1994	My Father the Hero	Megan	
1997	A Rat's Tale	Evelyn Jellybelly	
1998	54	Liz Vangelder	
1998	Just a Little Harmless Sex	Elaine	
1999	Loser Love	Annie Delacroix	
2009	The Joneses	KC	
2013	Walking Stories	Aunt Ruthie	Short film
2018	I Feel Pretty	Lily LeClaire	
2027	Alone at Dawn		Post-production

=== Television ===
Year	Title	Role	Notes
1973	A Time for Love	Darleen	TV film
1977	The Rhinemann Exchange	Leslie Jenner Hawkewood	TV miniseries
1978	Someone's Watching Me!	Leigh Michaels	TV film
1979	Institute for Revenge	Lilla Simms	TV film
1983	Starflight: The Plane That Couldn't Land	Erica Hansen	TV film
1983	The Cradle Will Fall	Kathy DeMaio	TV film
1984	Paper Dolls	Colette Ferrier	Recurring role
1985	Scandal Sheet	Meg North	TV film
1985	Faerie Tale Theatre	The Lady of Summer	"The Snow Queen"
1985	From Here to Maternity	Caroline	TV short
1986	Monte Carlo	Evelyn MacIntyre	TV miniseries
1986	Sins	ZZ Bryant	TV miniseries
1986	The Return of Mickey Spillane's Mike Hammer	Joanna Lake	TV film
1987	Timestalkers	Georgia Crawford	TV film
1987	Falcon Crest	Liz McDowell	4 episodes
1987	The Hitchhiker	Tess	"Riding the Nightmare"
1988	Perfect People	Barbara Laxton	TV film
1990	Blue Blood	Gerda Minsker	TV miniseries
1995–1996	Central Park West	Linda Fairchild Rush	TV series
1995–1997	Lauren Hutton and...	Interviewer/Herself	TV Series
1996	We the Jury	Wynne Atwood	TV film
1999	The Last Witness	Cynthia Kirkman Sutherland	TV film
2007	Manchild	Joyce	TV film
2007	Nip/Tuck	Fiona McNeil	"Carly Summers", "Joyce and Sharon Monroe"
