= Ultima II (cosmetics line) =

Cosmetics line

ULTIMA II
- Product type: Cosmetics, skin care
- Current owner: Revlon Inc.
- Produced by: Revlon Inc.
- Country: United States
- Introduced: 1945; 81 years ago (New York)
- Related brands: Revlon
- Markets: Worldwide
- Ambassador: Titi Kamal (Indonesia)
- Tagline: Collagen Expert From New York
- Website: www.ultimaii.com

ULTIMA II (cosmetics line) is a US-based cosmetics and skin care brand owned by Revlon. On June 16, 2022, its parent, Revlon, filed for Chapter 11 bankruptcy.

== History ==
The "Ultima" name was originally coined by Bea Castle, the highest placed female executive working for Revlon at the time, for a new moisturising cream - "ULTIMA, The Precious Cream". Following on from the success of the moisturiser, Revlon founder Charles Revson created the Charles Revson Inc. company in 1962 as the vehicle for his new top-of-the-range line: Ultima II. Revson claimed it was his favorite and most personal line, and it was the only line to which he directly attached his name until the launch of Revlon's "Charlie" perfume in 1973.

== Growth ==
To promote the brand Charles Revson's private yacht was named Ultima II. To keep with tradition, present Revlon owner Ronald Perelman named his yacht Ultima III. Ultima II was always intended to be an upmarket cosmetic line, as opposed to the core range Revlon and youth range Natural Wonder, in a marketing strategy called "laddering" inspired by General Motors. Advertising targeted upper-class women and featured models clad in haute couture gowns. For a decade, Ultima II's slogan was "Dedicated to the woman who spends a lifetime living up to her potential." Ultima II's launch and advertising techniques were likely a response to the growing success of competitor Estée Lauder, who also aimed for an upmarket position in the cosmetic, skin care, and fragrance industry.

== Timeline ==
In 1971, Ultima II became the first cosmetics company to sign a model, Lauren Hutton, to an exclusive contract. The move gained enough attention to make Lauren the first fashion model to grace the cover of Newsweek magazine. Ultima II went one step further and signed photographer Richard Avedon as her exclusive photographer.

In 1975, Ultima II partnered with jeweller Aldo Cipullo of Cartier to sell an authorized reproduction of the Love bracelet (Cartier), which he had designed six years earlier.

In 1983, Ultima II hired a 21-year-old Kevyn Aucoin to produce a new line of make-up products, The New Nakeds, making Kevyn the youngest ever creative director for a major cosmetics company. The New Nakeds collection was notable because it was the first time a major cosmetics company launched a collection with shades that were suitable for all races of women, and thus became highly popular.

In 1989, Revlon decided to expand the distribution of Ultima II from prestige department stores into moderate ones like JC Penney and drugstores like CVS, taking on a more mass-market approach.

== Decline ==
When Revlon decided to withdraw all of its department store counters, the brand's success soon began to decline. It was discontinued in North America in 2001. In Europe, a market specific range was produced by EPB (L'Europeenee des Produits de Beaute) a Revlon subsidiary in France. It was withdrawn from sale in Europe in 2008. However, Ultima II is available in Asia (specifically China/Hong Kong and Indonesia), having moderate success with their Clear White and Extraordinaire ranges. There is now an ULTIMA II Beauty Institute in the SOGO Department Store in Hong Kong.

== Products ==
The current range includes:

- Hydra Botanic
- Extraordinaire
- Procollagen Extrema
- Clear White Supreme
- Supreme Caviar DNA
- Extraordinaire Supreme
- CHR (Charles Haskel Revson's initials)
- Vital Radiance (once launched as a standalone brand in the U.S.)
- Full Moisture
- Under-it-all

The range also includes colour cosmetics, including lipsticks and lip glosses, mascaras, foundations, powders, eye shadows and liners, and blushes.

== Spokesmodels ==
Lauren Hutton modelled exclusively for Ultima II in the 1960s and 1970s. She was the nation's first cosmetics model to hold an exclusive contract. Models Cybill Shepherd, Aurélie Claudel, Kim Alexis, Monique Chevalier, and Jenny Brunt also represented the brand.

== See also ==
- Bayankala (skincare)
