= Bridget Bate Tichenor =

Artist

- Portrait by George Platt Lynes, New York 1945
- Born: Bridget Pamela Arkwright Bate; November 22, 1917; Paris, France
- Died: October 12, 1990 (aged 72); Mexico City, Mexico
- Education: Slade School of Fine Art, École des Beaux Arts, Art Students League of New York
- Known for: Painting, Fashion editor
- Notable work: Domadora de quimeras, Caja de crystal, Los encarcelados, Líderes
- Movement: Surrealism, magic realism

Bridget Bate Tichenor (born Bridget Pamela Arkwright Bate) (November 22, 1917 – October 12, 1990) was a British surrealist painter of fantastic art in the school of magic realism and a fashion editor. Born in Paris, she later embraced Mexico as her home.

== Family and early life in Europe ==
Bate was the daughter of Frederick Blantford Bate (c. 1886–1970) and Vera Nina Arkwright (1883–1948), who was also known as Vera Bate Lombardi. Although born in France, she spent her youth in England and attended schools in England, France, and Italy. She moved to Paris at age 16, to live with her mother, where she worked as a model for Coco Chanel. She lived between Rome and Paris from 1930 until 1938.

Fred Bate carefully guided his daughter with her art. He recommended she attend the Slade School in London, and visited her later at the Contembo Ranch in Mexico. Fred Bate's close friend, surrealist photographer Man Ray, photographed her at different stages of her modeling career from Paris to New York.

Vera Bate Lombardi is said to have been the public relations liaison to the royal families of Europe for Coco Chanel between 1925 and 1938. Her grandmother, Rosa Frederica Baring (1854–1927) was a member of the Baring banking family, being a great-granddaughter of Sir Francis Baring (1740–1810), the founder of Barings Bank, and Bridget Bate was therefore related to many British and European aristocratic families.

== New York and the United States ==
Bate married Hugh Joseph Chisholm at the Chisholm family home, Strathglass in Port Chester, New York on October 14, 1939. It was an arranged marriage, devised by her mother Vera through Cole Porter and his wife Linda's introduction, in order to remove Bate from Europe and the looming threat of the World War II. They had a son in Beverly Hills, California on December 21, 1940 named Jeremy Chisholm. H. Jeremy Chisholm was a noted businessman and equestrian in the US, United Kingdom and Europe, who was married to Jeanne Vallely-Lang Suydam and father to James Lang-Suydam Chisholm when he died in Boston in 1982.

In 1943, Bate was a student at the Art Students League of New York and studying under Reginald Marsh along with her friends, the painters Paul Cadmus and George Tooker. Acquaintances have described Bate during this time as "striking", "glamorous", and a "long-stemmed beauty with large azure eyes and sumptuous black hair". She lived in an apartment at the Plaza Hotel and wore clothes by Manhattan couturier Hattie Carnegie. It was around this time that the author Anaïs Nin wrote about her infatuation with Bate in her personal diary. Bate was at a party in the Park Avenue apartment of photographer George Platt Lynes, a friend who used her as a subject in his photographs, when she met Lynes' assistant, Jonathan Tichenor, in 1943. They started an affair in 1944 when her husband was away and working overseas for the US government. She divorced Chisholm on December 11, 1944 and moved into an Upper East Side townhouse in Manhattan that she shared with art patron Peggy Guggenheim. She married Jonathan Tichenor in 1945, taking his last name to become known as Bridget Bate Tichenor, and they moved into an artist's studio at 105 MacDougal Street in Manhattan.

== Painting technique ==
Bate Tichenor's painting technique was based upon 16th-century Italian tempera formulas that artist Paul Cadmus taught her in New York in 1945, where she would prepare an eggshell-finished gesso ground on masonite board and apply (instead of tempera) multiple transparent oil glazes defined through chiaroscuro with sometimes one hair of a #00 sable brush. Bate Tichenor considered her work to be of a spiritual nature, reflecting ancient occult religions, magic, alchemy, and Mesoamerican mythology in her Italian Renaissance style of painting.

== Life in Mexico ==
The cultures of Mesoamerica and her international background would influence the style and themes of Bate Tichenor's work as a magic realist painter in Mexico. She was among a group of surrealist and magic realist female artists who came to live in Mexico in the late 1940s and early 1950s. Her introduction to Mexico was through a cousin she had first met in Paris in the 1930s: Edward James, the British surrealist art collector and sponsor of the magazine Minotaure. James lived in Las Pozas, San Luis Potosí, and his home in Mexico had an enormous surrealist sculpture garden with natural waterfalls, pools and surrealist sculptures in concrete. In 1947, James invited her to visit him again at his home Xilitia, near Tampico in the rich Olmec culture of the Gulf Coast. He had urged her for many years to receive secret spiritual initiations that he had undergone, and a lifetime change and new artistic direction resulted from her epiphanies during this trip. After visiting Mexico, Bate Tichenor obtained a divorce in 1953 from her second husband, Jonathan Tichenor, and moved to Mexico in the same year, where she made her permanent home and lived for the rest of her life. She left her marriage and job as a professional fashion and accessories editor for Vogue behind and was now alongside expatriate painters such as Leonora Carrington, Remedios Varo, Alice Rahon, and photographer Kati Horna.

Having lived in varied European and American cultures with multiple identities reflecting her life passages, Bate Tichenor recognized the Pre-Columbian cycles of creation, destruction, and resurrection that echoed the events of the catastrophes of her own life mounted within the dismantling and reconstructive context of two World Wars. The openness of Mexico at that time fueled her personal expectations of a future filled with endless artistic inspiration in a truly new world founded upon metaphysics, where a movement of societal, political, and spiritual ideals were being immortalized in the arts.

At the time of Bate Tichenor's move to Mexico in 1953, she began what would become a lifetime journey through her art and mysticism, inspired by her belief in ancestral spirits, to achieve self-realization. While painting alone and in isolation, she removed her familiar and societal masks to find her own personal human and spiritual identities; she would then reposition those hidden identities with new masks and characters in her paintings that represented her own sacred beliefs and truths. This guarded internal process of self-discovery and fulfillment was allegorically portrayed with a cast of mythological characters engaged in magical settings. She painted a dramatization of her own life and quests on canvas through an expressive visual language and an artistic vocabulary that she kept secret.

In 1958, she participated in the First Salon of Women's Art at the Galerías Excelsior of Mexico, together with Carrington, Rahon, Varo, and other contemporary women painters of her era. That same year, she bought the Contembo ranch near the remote village of Ario de Rosales, Michoacán where she painted reclusively with her extensive menagerie of pets until 1978.

Bate Tichenor counted painters Carrington, Alan Glass, Zachary Selig and artist Pedro Friedeberg among her closest friends and artistic contemporaries in Mexico.

Between 1982 and 1984, Bate Tichenor lived in Rome and painted a series of paintings titled Masks, Spiritual Guides, and Dual Deities. Her final years were spent at her home in San Miguel de Allende, Guanajuato, Mexico.

== Contembo Ranch ==
The architecture of Bate Tichenor's house at Contembo Ranch in Michoacán was a simple Tuscan-style country villa cross-shaped designed brick and adobe two-story structure that she built with her Purépechan lover Roberto in 1958. Ario de Rosales was named "place where something was sent to be said" in the Purépecha language. Bate Tichenor became an artistic channel for the place that she chose to call her home.

Many of the faces and bodies of her magical creatures in her paintings were based upon her assorted terriers, chihuahuas, and Italian mastiffs, sheep, goats, monkeys, parrots, iguanas, snakes, horses, cows, and local Purépecha servants and friends.

The light, colors and landscapes of Bate Tichenor's paintings were inspired by the topography of the volcanic land that surrounded her mountaintop home. There was a curvature of the Earth that could be seen from her second-story studio where the pine tree covered red mountains cascaded towards the Pacific Ocean. There also was a waterfall with turquoise pools of water that traversed her property.

== Death and legacy ==
At the time of Bate Tichenor's death in the Daniel de Laborde-Noguez and Marie Aimée de Montalembert house on the Calle Tabasco in Mexico City in 1990, she chose to be exclusively with her close friends. Bate Tichenor's mother Vera Bate Lombardi was a close friend of Comte Léon de Laborde, who was a fervent admirer of Coco Chanel in her youth and had introduced Lombardi to Chanel. Comte Léon de Laborde's grandson, economist Carlos de Laborde-Noguez, his wife Marina Lascaris, his brother Daniel de Laborde-Noguez and his wife, Marie Aimée de Motalembert became Bate Tichenor's most respected allies, trusted friends, and caretakers at the end of her life in their home in Mexico City.

Bate Tichenor was the subject of a 1985 documentary titled Rara Avis, shot in Baron Alexander von Wuthenau's home in Mexico City. It was directed by Tufic Makhlouf and focused on Bate Tichenor's life in Europe, her being a subject for the photographers Man Ray, Cecil Beaton, Irving Penn, John Rawlings, George Platt Lynes, her career as a Vogue fashion editor in New York with Condé Nast art director Alexander Liberman between 1945 and 1952, and her magic realism painting career in Mexico that began in 1956. The title of the film, Rara Avis, is a Latin expression that comes from the Roman poet Juvenal meaning a rare and unique bird, the "black swan." Rara Avis was screened at the 2008 FICM Morelia international film festival.

Artist Pedro Friedeberg wrote about Bate Tichenor and their life in Mexico in his 2011 book of memoirs De Vacaciones Por La Vida (Holiday For Life), including stories of her interaction with his friends and contemporaries Salvador Dalí, Leonora Carrington, Kati Horna, Tamara de Lempicka, Zachary Selig, and Edward James.

== Works of art ==
Autorretrato (Self-Portrait) by Bridget Bate Tichenor, undated, oil on canvas, 19 11/16 x 19 11/16 inches, from a private collection.

Los encarcelados by Bridget Bate Tichenor, 1965, oil on masonite mounted inside of wooden caged boxes, 107 x 27 x 25 cm, at the 2012 LACMA In Wonderland exhibition.

Interest in Bate Tichenor's paintings by art collectors and museums has been increasing in recent years, as well as collections of art photographs with her as the subject. Her paintings were first sold in 1954 by the Ines Amor Gallery in Mexico City, and then later by her patron, the late Mexican art dealer and collector Antonio de Souza at the Galeria Souza in the Paseo de la Reforma, Mexico City. In 1955, the Karning Gallery, directed by Robert Isaacson, represented her. In 1972 and 1974, she exhibited at the Galeria Pecanins, Colonia Roma, Mexico City. A comprehensive retrospective exhibition was held at the Instituto de Bellas Artes de San Miguel de Allende in February 1990, nine months before her death. She left 200 paintings that were divided between Pedro Friedeberg and the de Laborde-Noguez family. Her works became a part of important international private and museum collections in the United States, Mexico and Europe that included the Churchill and Rockefeller families. They were sought after for their refined esoteric nature with detail in master painting technique.

Two 1941 gelatin silver print portraits of Bate Tichenor by avant-garde artist Man Ray were auctioned by Christie's London in 1996. Another 1941 gelatin silver print photograph of Bate Tichenor by Man Ray was auctioned by Sotheby's New York in 1997. A silver gelatin print of fashion photographer Irving Penn's 1949 photograph of Bate Tichenor and model Jean Patchett, titled The Tarot Reader, resides in the permanent collection of the Smithsonian American Art Museum. Two paintings by Bate Tichenor were auctioned by Christie's in July, 2007 at New York's Rockefeller Plaza, and both received almost 10 times the original estimates in the auction of Mexican actress María Félix's estate. Bate Tichenor's oil on canvas titled Domadora de quimeras, featuring the face of María Félix with details by painter Antoine Tzapoff, went for $20,400 USD, which was several times higher than its original low estimate of $2000 USD. Another painting by Bate Tichenor, Caja de crystal, also sold for much more than its estimated price.

In 2008, the Museo de Arte Contemporáneo de Monterrey held an exhibition of Bate Tichenor's work, including her paintings among 50 prominent Mexican artists such as Frida Kahlo. It was titled History of Women: Twentieth-Century Artists in Mexico. The exhibition centered on women who had developed their artistic activities within individual and diverse disciplines while working in Mexico.

Bate Tichenor was featured in the 2012 exhibition In Wonderland: The Surrealist Adventures of Women Artists in Mexico and the United States, organized by LACMA and the Museo de Arte Moderno. Included were Bate Tichenor's paintings Líderes, Autorretrato (Self-Portrait), and Los encarcelados, a tall work of four stacked wooden cages with painted masonite heads inside of each box and a pyramid on the top of the structure. The exhibition took place at the LACMA Resnick Pavilion in Los Angeles.

The Museum of the City of Mexico's director, Cristina Faesler, has organized over 100 paintings for an exhibition dedicated to Bate Tichenor in Mexico City beginning May 23, 2012 to August 5, 2012. The exhibition at the Museo de la Ciudad de México is a visual monograph of Bate Tichenor's work, her surrealist vision and technique.
