= Frederick Blantford Bate =

American journalist (1886–1970)

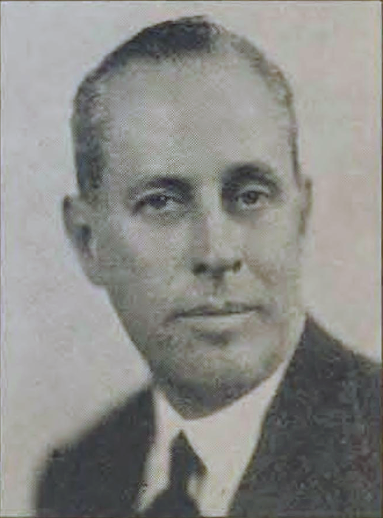
- Fred Bate in the 1930s
- Born: Frederick Blantford Bate; November 13, 1886; Chicago, Illinois, U.S.
- Died: December 24, 1970 (aged 84); Waterford, Virginia, U.S.
- Occupations: Journalist and broadcaster
- Spouses: (1) Sally Plows (divorced); (2) Vera Bate Lombardi; (3) Genevieve Gillette
- Children: Bridget Bate Tichenor (by Vera Bate Lombardi),

Frederick Blantford Bate (13 November, 1886 – December 24, 1970) was an American journalist and radio broadcaster for the NBC network in Europe in the 1930s. He was a representative for NBC in United Kingdom and Western Europe before and during World War II.

He was the husband of Vera Bate Lombardi, the British socialite, and the father of Bridget Bate Tichenor, a surrealist artist.

== Family ==
Frederick Blantford Bate was born to an English father Harry B. Bate in Chicago in 1886. His first marriage was to the Chicago candy-manufacturing heiress Sally K. Plows (1889-1947), that ended in divorce on the grounds of his desertion.

== Early career ==
He was active with the first automobile ambulance service during the First World War and was a mechanical officer, involved with the organization of the first American Ambulance that became an ambulance service connected with the First World War armies in the field. During his time in France he met Vera Arkwright, who was serving at the American hospital in Paris. They married in 1916. Their daughter Bridget was born in France in November 1917. Fred and Vera divorced in 1929.

== NBC ==
Bate had served on a War Reparations Committee headed by Owen D. Young of General Electric, and it was through Young that he had come to the attention of the NBC. Bate was hired by the network as NBC's European manager in summer 1932.

Bate's key objective was to expand NBC presence in the European market and to develop international broadcasting into a viable business for the network. Shortly after he was stationed by the NBC in Paris and then moved to represent the network in London. During this time Bate worked closely with his colleague Max Jordan who represented NBC in the Central European countries.

Bate came to know Edward, Prince of Wales, as a result of his marriage in 1916 to Vera Arkwright, who was known to the Prince. This connection became significant for NBC when Edward's relationship with Wallis Simpson threw the British Government into a constitutional crisis. Because of Bate's connections, NBC provided more up-to-the-minute radio coverage of that story than any rival networks. Bate was the NBC representative in London at the time and had access to the King. When the story of the king's affair with Wallis Simpson and the possibility of an abdication suddenly broke on a startled world, Bate was on holiday in New York. The fastest way back to London then took five days. He telephoned Alistair Cooke and asked him to go immediately to Broadcasting House and beam over a news dispatch for NBC before the midnight circuit, which the rival radio network, CBS, had booked. Cooke did so, and for the next 10 days of the abdication crisis he broadcast to America six or seven times a day.

In 1940, Bate was wounded by shrapnel when a bomb hit NBC's offices in London during World War II. He returned to work after spending 10 days in a hospital. At the end of the Second World War Bate moved back to the United States. He died, at Waterford, Virginia, in October 1970.
