= Pedro Friedeberg =

Mexican artist and designer (1936–2026)

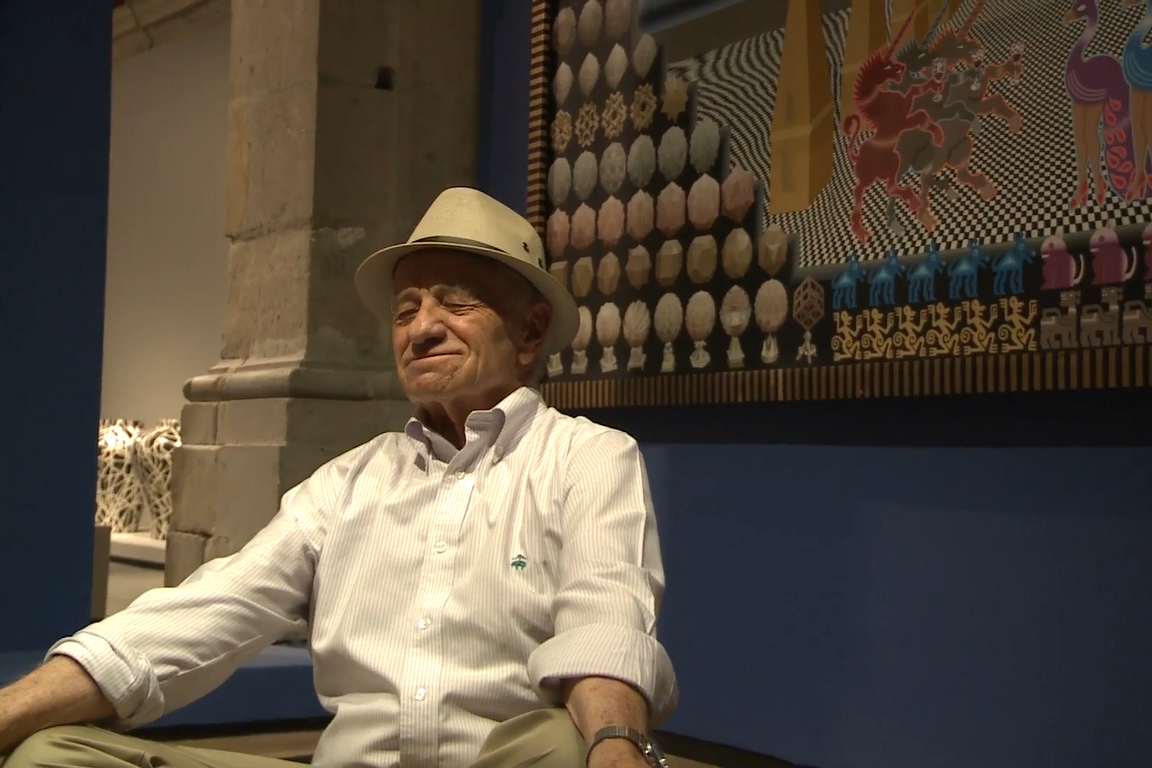
- Friedeberg in 2016
- Born: Pietro Enrico Hoffman; January 11, 1936; Florence, Kingdom of Italy
- Died: March 5, 2026 (aged 90); San Miguel de Allende, Guanajuato, Mexico
- Education: Universidad Iberoamericana
- Movement: Surrealism
- Spouses: Wanda Zamoyska; Carmen Gutiérrez
- Children: 2

Pedro Friedeberg (January 11, 1936 – March 5, 2026) was an Italian-born Mexican artist and designer known for his surrealist work filled with lines colors and ancient and religious symbols. His best known piece is the “Hand-Chair” a sculpture/chair designed for people to sit on the palm, using the fingers as back and arm rests. Friedeberg began studying as an architect but did not complete his studies as he began to draw designs against the conventional forms of the 1950s and even completely implausible ones such as houses with artichoke roofs. However, his work caught the attention of artist Mathias Goeritz who encouraged him to continue as an artist. Friedeberg became part of a group of surrealist artists in Mexico which included Leonora Carrington and Alice Rahon, who were irreverent, rejecting the social and political art which was dominant at the time. Friedeberg had a lifelong reputation for being eccentric, and stated that art is dead because nothing new is being produced.

== Early life and education ==
Friedeberg was born Pietro Enrico Hoffman on January 11, 1936, in Florence to German-Jewish parents, Julius and Gerda (née Landsberg) Hoffman. His mother later married Erwin Friedeberg. The family escaped from Europe at the beginning of the Second World War arriving in Mexico when he was three years old. He remembered his grandmother marking names in European newspapers of family members who had survived the Holocaust. He said that he did not talk about his childhood because it was "German", describing it as "discipline", "torture"” and "punishment". He was made to learn violin and speak several languages and he hated to be at home. He was not raised Jewish but rather atheist. Once a servant took him in secret to a church to be baptized. He said because of these experiences, he had seven religions, one for each day of the week.

As a child he expressed an interest in art early. His mother said that when he was two he liked to sit in front of the Santa Maria Novella Church in Florence and try to draw it. In his youth he was captivated by the Renaissance architecture of the churches and the Leaning Tower of Pisa. When he was older, he traced the images in the art books that belonged to his father, favoring the works of Canaletto, Giovanni Battista Piranesi, and others from the 18th century. He also liked the perspectives of the drawings of M. C. Escher.

He studied for a while in Boston and then entered the Universidad Iberoamericana in 1957 to study architecture. He began to study architecture because of his own interest and pressure from his parents but made it only to the third year. His professors favored symmetrical architecture such as that of Ludwig Mies van der Rohe, who designed the Seagram Building in New York, which Friedeberg thought boring. He preferred the works of Antoni Gaudí, creating circular plans, and he began to design impossible works such as houses with artichoke roofs and skyscrapers topped by pears, which earned him failing grades.

However, his time at Iberoamericana allowed him to meet artist Mathias Goeritz, who appreciated his work. Goeritz told Friedeberg to continue with his art and ignore his parents. During the summers, Friedeberg worked as Goeritz’s secretary, which included helping on artistic projects.

Through family and friends he met surrealist artists such as Remedios Varo, who recommended his work to Galería Diana, leading to Friedeberg’s first exhibition in 1960 when he was only twenty two. From these connections, he began to meet other surrealist artists such as Leonora Carrington and Alice Rahon to become a member of Los Hartos (The Fed-Up), in 1961. This group was based on Dadaist principles: the creation of anti-art for art's sake, rejecting political and social painting. This group's influence led Friedeberg to believe in the autonomy of aestheticism. Later, he and Javier Giron organized a movement called Chinchismo from the Mexican Spanish word chinche which means bug. They asked thirty artists to create bug words and called Pita Amor their muse, with the idea of ridiculing "-isms" or movements in art.

Friedeberg's reputation for eccentricity was lifelong, not only linked to surrealist artist but other eccentrics such as Edward James and Antonio Souza. Friedeberg had a tendency to protect and defend those who have lost their fame and fortune, such as Pita Amor did in her old age, when she was ridiculed by elements of Mexican society. He said that he consulted the I-Ching every day, and had a collection of saints. His biography on the Internet included a passage that read:

I get up at the crack of noon and, after watering my pirañas, I breakfast off things Corinthian. Later in the day I partake in an Ionic lunch followed by a Doric nap. On Tuesdays I sketch a volute or two, and perhaps a pediment, if the mood overtakes me. Wednesday I have set aside for anti-meditation. On Thursdays I usually relax whereas on Friday I write autobiographies

He said that the world lacks eccentrics today because people have returned to being sheep through the consumer culture and television which wants us all to be the same.

== Career ==
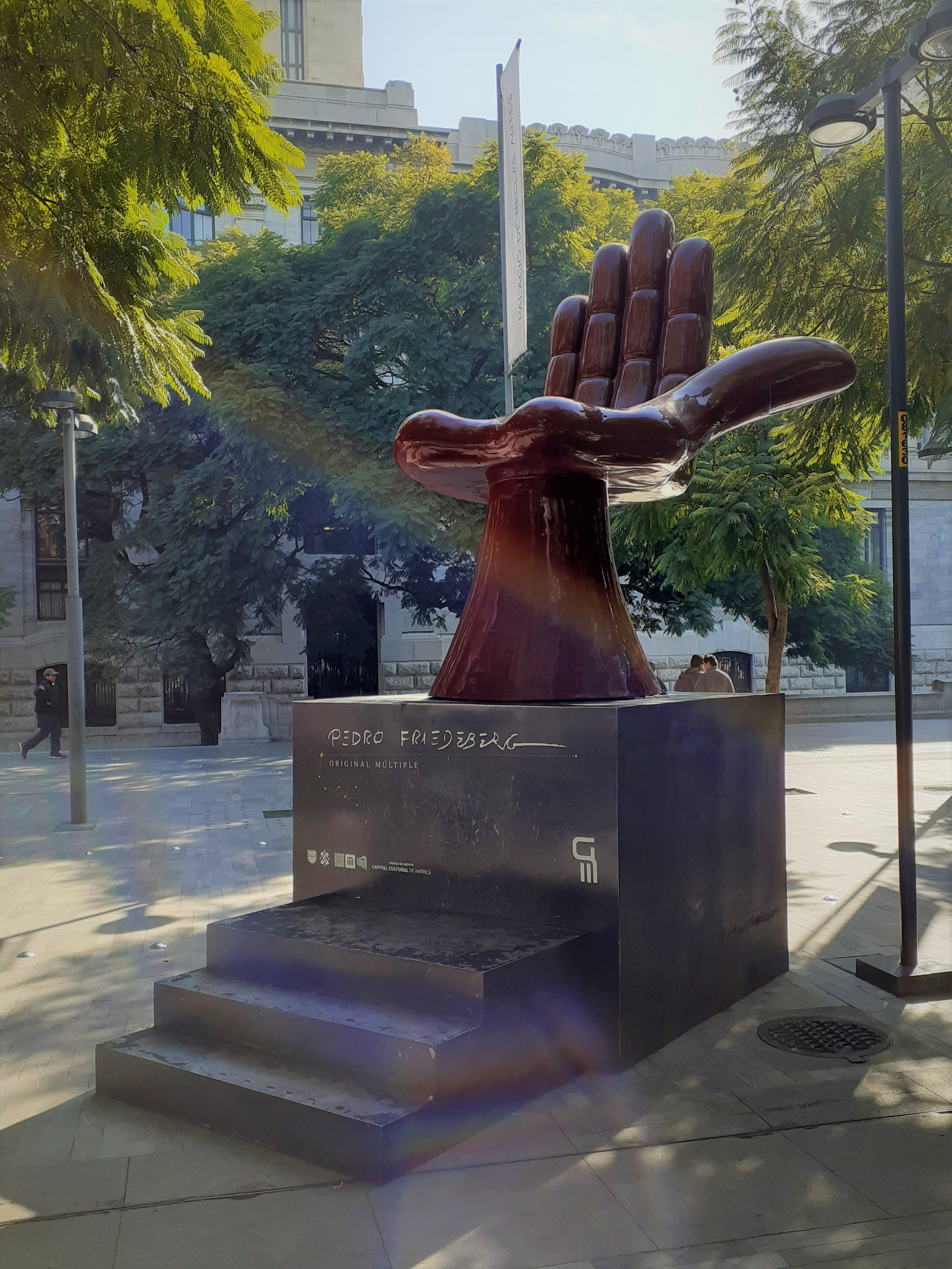
Hand-chair, monumental sculpture by Pedro Friedeberg located in the Alameda Central in Mexico City

Friedeberg painted, created murals for institutions in Mexico and abroad, illustrated books and book covers, and created furniture and set designs. He was the art director, along with Sergio Villegas of a spectacular called Arbol de la Vida. He began designing furniture in the 1960s, rejecting the then-dominant international style of architecture. He executed chairs, tables, couches, and love seats in fantastic designs. He is best known for his hand-chair, which has sold more than 5,000 copies since it was created in 1962. The original chair was made of wood and covered in gold leaf. It is designed to allow one to sit on the palm, using the fingers as a back and arm rest. He declared that he was never really relaxed and stated that he had painted one canvas per week, 52 weeks a year for the fifty years of his career in addition to sculptures and chair designs. His paintings, sculpture, and furniture wera all considered very fashionable, called "chic" in the 1960s and 1970s.

His first two individual exhibitions were at the Diana Gallery in 1959 and the Protec Gallery in 1960, both in Mexico City. In the 1960s, he had sixteen exhibitions in Mexico, France, New York, Portugal, and im 1963 the Pan American Union in Washington, DC. In the 1970s, he had nineteen exhibitions in various cities in Mexico and the United States, Barcelona, Haifa in Israel, and Canada. In the 1980s, he enjoyed thirteen solo exhibitions of his work including at the Museo de Arte Moderno in Mexico City. In the 1990s, he had twenty-one, mostly in Mexico which a tribute to his work in 1997 and an exhibition in Colombia. In the 2000s, he had nine, all in Mexico except for one in Germany in 2000 and one in Belgium in 2003. He also participated in many group exhibitions from 1960 to 2003.

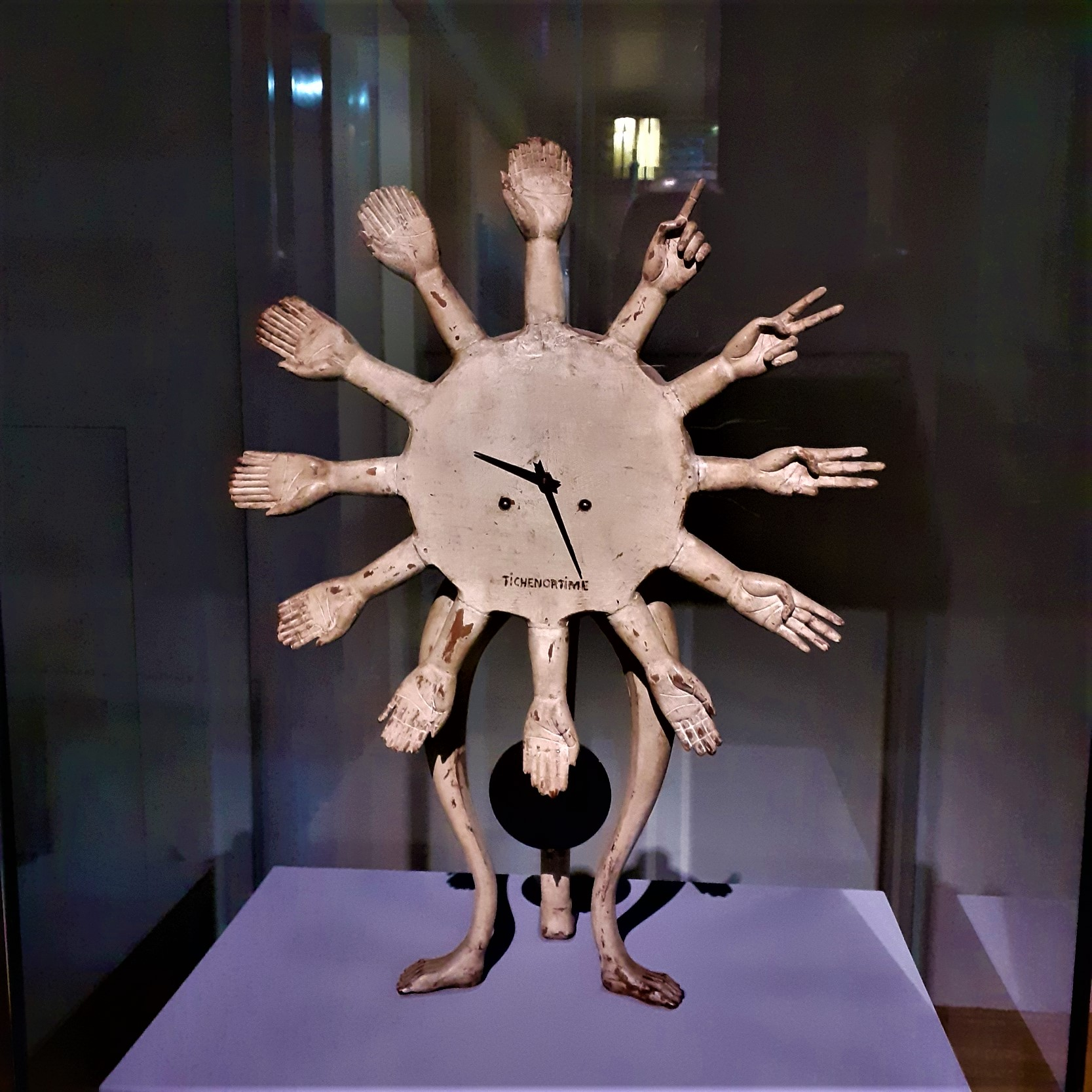
Clock sculpture "Tichenortime", Pedro Friedeberg, 1963, from the series named after his dear friend, the surrealist painter Bridget Tichenor.

His awards include the Córdoba Argentina Biennale in 1966 (2nd prize), the Solar Exhibition in Mexico City in 1967 (1st prize), the Argentina Engraving Triennale in Buenos Aires in 1979, and the XI Biennale of Graphic Works in Tokyo (Special Award) in 1984. He was named an “Artistic Creator” by the National System of Mexican and Foreign Creators in 1993. His work and life have been featured in many books from 1972 to the present. These books include his autobiography published in Mexico “De vacaciones por la vida, Memorias no autorizadas” (On vacation for life, Unauthorized memories) edited by Trilce and CONACULTA . In his autobiography, Friedeberg wrote about experiences with his many friends in the art world, including Salvador Dalí, Leonora Carrington, Kati Horna, Tamara de Lempicka, Mathias Goeritz, Edward James, Zachary Selig, and Bridget Bate Tichenor.

His works can be found in the permanent collections of the Museo de Arte Moderno, the José Luis Cuevas Museum, the Televisa Cultural Center, all in Mexico City, the Museum of Contemporary Art in Toluca, the Museum of Contemporary Art in Culiacán, the Museum of Contemporary Art in Pátzcuaro, the Museum of Modern Art in New York, the Museum of Contemporary Art in Chicago, the Museum of Contemporary Art in New Orleans, the Library of Congress in Washington DC, the Rose Art Museum of Brandeis University in Boston, the National Research Library in Ottawa, the Musée du Louvre in Paris, the Israel Museum in Jerusalem, the National Museum of Modern Art in Baghdad, the Ponce Museum of Art in Puerto Rico, the Franklin Rawson Museum in Argentina, the Omar Rayo Museum in Colombia, the Smithsonian Institution in Washington, DC., and the Museum of Arts and Design in New York.

== Artistry ==
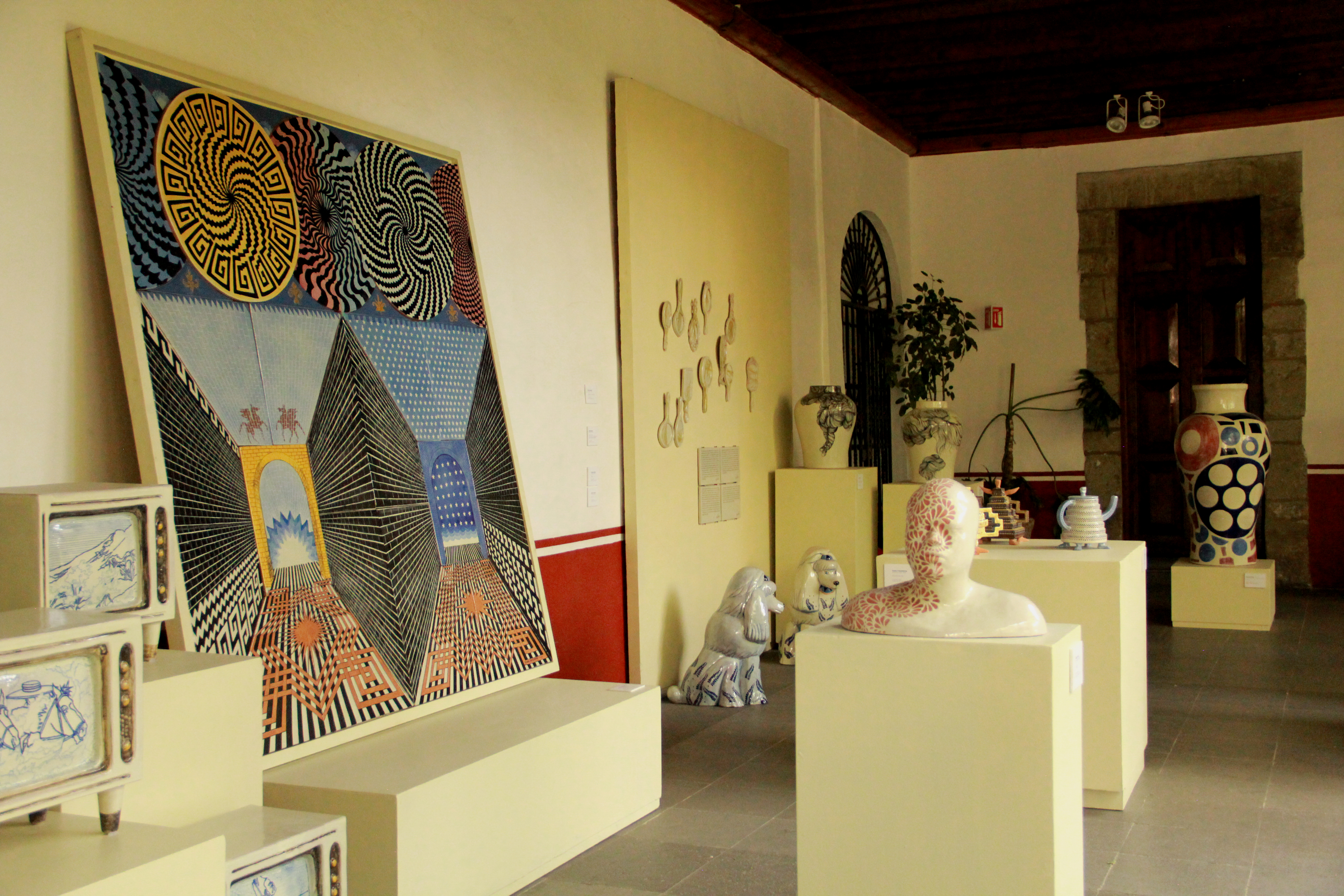
View of the El cinco de mayo de 1862. Uriarte Talavera Contemporánea exhibition at the Franz Mayer Museum, Mexico City. The ceramic mural is by the artist.

From his first exhibition, Friedeberg's work had an easily identifiable style, although it is not easily classifiable. He often used architectural drawing as his medium to create unusual compositions including designs for useless objects, often as a result of boredom. He studied and incorporated elements of various artistic and design trends from the eras through which he lived, from Art Nouveau to Op art. Much of his work has an industrial quality, stemming from his training as an architect. However, there is a dreamlike quality as well, painting impossible palaces and other structures, with innumerable halls and rooms, secret passages, and stairs, which are often absurd.

Irony and surfeit are generally expressed through the almost hallucinogenic repetition of elements and formal disorder, but it is the result of conscious thought. He classified his work as eclectic and hybrid. His art is not political, it is art for art's sake and he stated it is elitist. He did not believe in making art "for the people" because most people do not care about it. His art almost always has a sarcastic and cynical touch. He said his only intention in his art was to make fun of himself and everyone else.

His paintings, furniture, and other media are often characterized as being filled with ornamentation, with little or no white space, with lines, colors, and symbols referencing ancient scriptures, Aztec codices, Catholicism, Hinduism, and the occult. While his art has been criticized as adding ornament for its own sake or even distraction, he disagreed, saying that ornamentation is the oldest form of fine art, added to give objects an exceptional, even religious quality. He called his extensive ornamentation, which includes elements from ancient texts, "Nintendo Churrigueresque".

Friedeberg belonged to a group of 20th-century surrealist artists, which in Mexico include Gunther Gerzso, Mathias Goeritz, Alice Rahon, Kati Horna, Leonora Carrington, Remedios Varo, and Paul Antragne, who were grouped together under the name of Los Hartos. They were original, eccentric, irreverent, and iconoclastic. His techniques did not change after he started and themes changed only a little, as latterly he included fantastic animal hybrids in some of his work. He criticized modern artists saying, "Art has died, after surrealism, there is nothing new." He said that people have lost their taste for irony, sarcasm and the absurd.

== Personal life ==
Friedeberg was married four times. His third wife was Polish Countess Wanda Zamoyska. This marriage lasted twelve years which he described as surrealist, a circus and crazy, but tiring. His last wife was Carmen Gutiérrez, with whom he had two children, Diana and David. He said Carmen is a very serious woman, unlike his other former wives. Having children changed his life because he could no longer travel around the world and stay up until 5 am drinking.

Friedeberg died in San Miguel de Allende, Guanajuato, Mexico, on March 5, 2026, at the age of 90. He had hoped to be buried at the San Michele Cemetery, on the Isola di San Michele in Venice, where Stravinsky and Diaghilev are buried, in a tomb with a white gondola and black feathers.
