= Vera Bate Lombardi =

Socialite during the Second World War

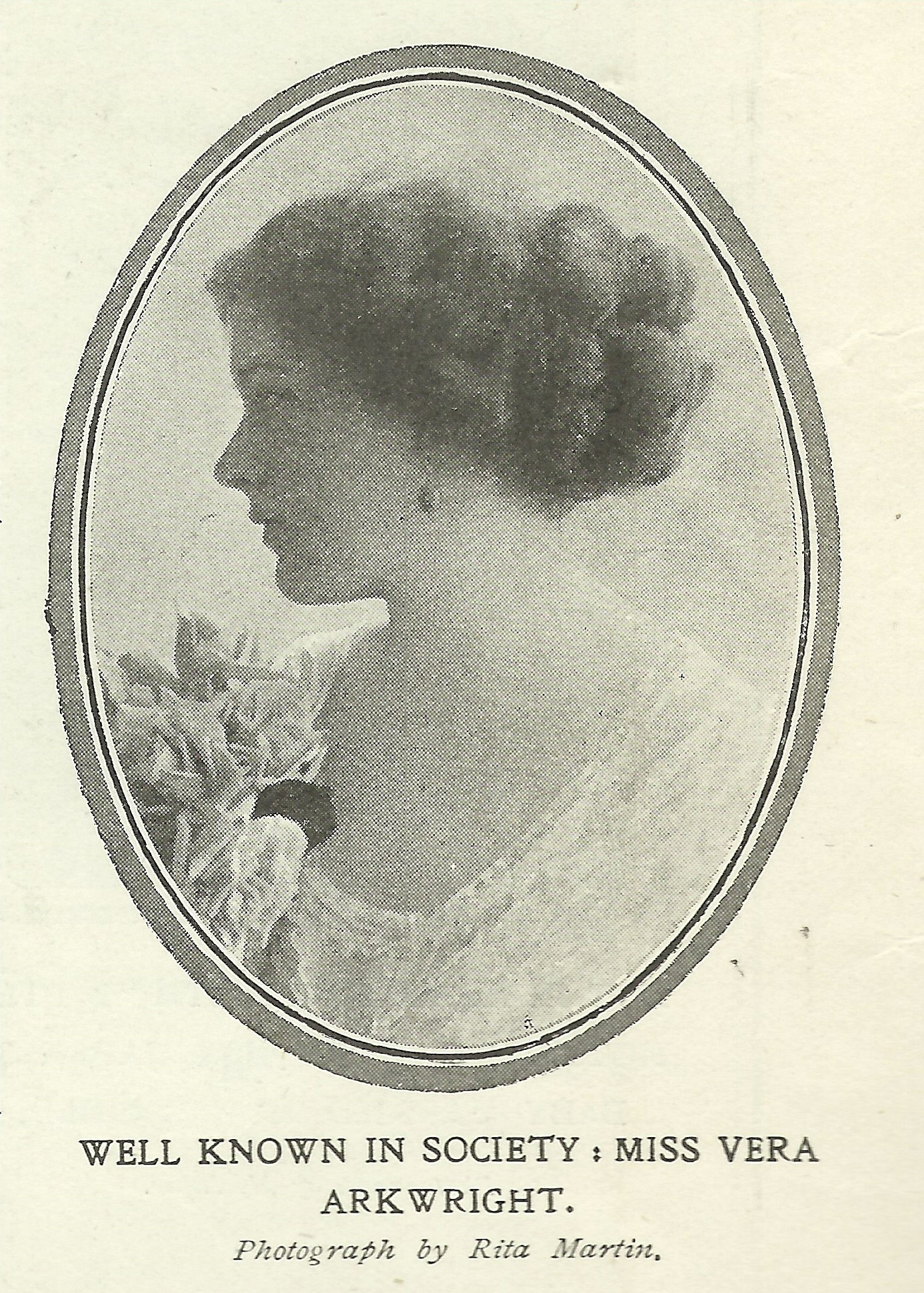
- "Well known in Society", 1909
- Born: Vera Nina Arkwright; 11 August 1883; London, England
- Died: 22 May 1947 (aged 63); Rome, Italy
- Occupations: WWI nurse, socialite, associate of Coco Chanel
- Known for: Introduced Coco Chanel to English society, inspired Chanel's "English Look", denounced Chanel for collaborating with the Nazis

Vera Bate Lombardi (born Vera Nina Arkwright, 11 August 1883 – 22 May 1947) was a socialite and close associate of Coco Chanel and the mother of Bridget Bate Tichenor. A British citizen at birth, she became a citizen of the United States after her first marriage and of Italy after her second marriage. She was arrested in Italy in 1943 under suspicions of spying for the British during World War II. After her release, she made her way to Madrid, where she denounced Chanel for collaborating with the Nazis.

== Early life ==
Lombardi was born at 17 Ovington Square, Kensington, London, 11 August 1883, the daughter of Capt. Frank Wigsell Arkwright and his then wife Rosa Baring.

=== Marriages ===
Lombardi's first marriage was to Frederick Blantford Bate in 1916. Bate was an American whom she had met while volunteering as a nurse in an American hospital in Paris. They had one daughter, Bridget born in 1917. Lombardi divorced Bate in 1929. She then married Italian cavalry officer Alberto Lombardi, a member of the Italian Fascist Party and held in high esteem by Benito Mussolini. Lombardi joined her husband in Rome after 1929 and joined the Fascist Party. In Rome, Lombardi and her husband lived the grand life, residing in his villa on via Barnaba Oriani, situated in one of the most exclusive sections of Rome.

=== Association with Coco Chanel ===
Lombardi was a popular member of the British elite, who in her youth attracted the attention of a cadre of suitors. She was an enthusiast of the sporting life, an avid participant in the outdoor activities so favoured by the upper tier and titled members of society. The wealth and status enjoyed by this rarified group allowed them the means and leisure to engage in hunting and sailing and to lead lives dedicated to pleasure and self-gratification.

Adapting the traditional clothing worn for the British sporting life to her modern vision of dress, Chanel found in Lombardi and her social set an inspirational template for design. Linking Lombardi's promotional value to business success, Chanel hired the thirty-seven-year-old Lombardi as public relation representative for the House of Chanel in 1920. It was said of Lombardi that "No one was more keenly appreciated by London high society...". The Chanel look worn by Lombardi was the visible daily attire, the casual yet chic style that became identified with the modern ease of the Chanel couture. The Lombardi–Chanel friendship was a close one, sustained over many years. Their formal business association ended in 1930 when Lombardi left Chanel to work for couturier Edward Molyneux.

Lombardi afforded Chanel entree into – and social acceptance by – the highest levels of British aristocracy. It was in Monte Carlo in 1923 that Chanel was introduced by Lombardi to the vastly wealthy 2nd Duke of Westminster, Hugh Richard Arthur Grosvenor, known to his intimates as "Bendor". She also subsequently introduced Chanel to the Prince of Wales, Edward VIII.

==== Suspicions of espionage ====
Lombardi's English habits, her high born affiliations and her frequent presence at social functions held at the British Embassy in Rome, made her a person of interest to the Fascist police and various intelligence agencies. Her activities were monitored by the Italian Political Investigation Service, the Italian Interior and the War Office. In 1936, the surveillance of Lombardi produced an official report, which stated in part: "This lady's mysterious and varied lifestyle makes us suspect that she is in the service of Great Britain without the knowledge of her husband, who is a highly respected person and sincere patriot..." The continuous surveillance was suspended on the basis of two factors. No evidence was ever uncovered that proved Lombardi was an espionage agent and her husband's military status and loyalty to the Fascism put any accusations against her into question. In the coming years, and throughout World War II, suspicions surrounding Lombardi continued and her association with Chanel, would later bring Lombardi to the attention of British Military Intelligence, MI6.

In 1943, she was arrested and held for a week in a women's prison in Rome under suspicion of having been spying for the British Secret Service for a decade. She was released on orders of the German police in Rome. According to 1991's Hitler's Intelligence Chief: Walter Schellenberg, the Germans expected her to work as an agent for them, intending to bring her to Paris to rendezvous with Chanel. Joining Chanel and Dincklage in Paris, Lombardi was subsequently issued a passport, by order of the Paris Gestapo chief, Karl Bömelburg, allowing her to travel to Spain.

===== "Operation Modellhut" =====
Lombardi unwittingly became embroiled in political intrigue involving Chanel and her lover Hans Günther von Dincklage, and orchestrated by SS Nazi intelligence at the highest levels. In late 1943 or early 1944, Chanel recruited her old friend, Lombardi, to travel with her to Madrid to act as intermediary, delivering a letter of Chanel to be forwarded to Winston Churchill through the British Embassy. The plan, code named "Operation Modellhut", was an attempt to press England to end hostilities with Germany. Lombardi was led to believe that the forthcoming journey to Madrid would be a business trip exploring the possibilities of establishing the Chanel couture in Madrid. The mission ultimately proved a failure as Lombardi, on her arrival in Madrid, denounced Chanel and others as Nazi spies. No evidence exists that Lombardi herself was ever involved in actual espionage activity, though it is acknowledged that she was an informer.

In March 1944, Lombardi, still stranded in Madrid, wrote an appeal to her aristocratic contacts in England to intercede with Churchill, and have him use his influence to reunite her with her husband in Rome. It was not until early in January 1945, that Lombardi was finally permitted leave Madrid. The British Foreign Office had notified the embassy in Madrid: "Allied Forces have withdrawn their objection and the lady is free to return to Italy..." Churchill had ultimately come to Lombardi's rescue, as verified in a classified communication written to Churchill four days later from Allied Headquarters in Paris. Lombardi expressed her gratitude to Churchill in a letter she wrote him in May 1945: "Thank you with all my heart for what you found time to do for me..."

== Later years ==
Lombardi remained separated from her husband, who was still in Italy. Both Chanel and Lombardi wrote to Churchill to appeal for his help in reuniting her with her husband. Although Churchill initially rebuffed Lombardi's request, he did eventually intercede on her behalf, reaching out to Rome in 1944. In April or May 1945, she was reunited in Italy with her husband, who, by World War II's end, had managed to rehabilitate his reputation and obscure his past loyalty to Mussolini and enthusiasm for fascism by aligning himself with the Allies.

== Sources ==
- Crisp, Frederick Arthur, ed. (1914). Visitation of England and Wales. Vol. 18. Privately printed.
- Doerries, Reinhard R.; Weinberg, Gerhard L. (2009). Hitler's intelligence chief: Walter Schellenberg. Enigma Books. ISBN 978-1-929631-77-3.
- Madsen, Axel (1991). Chanel: A Woman of Her Own. Macmillan. ISBN 978-0-8050-1639-0.
- Picardie, Justine (2010). Coco Chanel: The Legend and the Life. HarperCollins. ISBN 978-0-06-196385-8.
- Vaughan, Hal (2011). Sleeping with the Enemy: Coco Chanel's Secret War. Alfred A. Knopf. ISBN 978-0-307-59263-7.
