= Bayankala (skincare) =

Natural skincare brand originating from Shanghai, China

Bayankala 巴颜 喀拉
- Type: Private
- Industry: Cosmetics
- Founded: January 1, 2008
- Founder: Jean Zimmermann
- Headquarters: Shanghai, China
- Number of locations: 19
- Area served: Shanghai
- Key people: Jean Zimmermann, CEO
- Products: skincare cosmetics
- Website: www.bayankala.com

Bayankala is a natural skincare brand originating from Shanghai, China, that was conceived of by a French entrepreneur and long-time resident and "old China hand", Jean Zimmermann. Zimmermann founded the brand together with a Chinese herbalist. The inspiration for the brand came during his time as General Manager of Lane Crawford department stores in China when he decided to create a high-end Chinese brand.

The brand itself is named after the Bayan Har Mountains in south-central Qinghai, which contain the source of the Yellow River. The symbol of the brand is the "hulu," (葫芦 pinyin: húlu) the Chinese bottle gourd that was traditionally used as a vessel by and hung out front as a sign of the Chinese pharmacy.

== Traditional Chinese ingredients ==
Bayankala claims to be the first Chinese "luxury skin care brand" with recipes from traditional Chinese herbal medicine. The brand concept features 5 traditionally used ingredients from Chinese herbology. The brand is manufactured in Guangzhou in Southern China, and some product has been certified organic in China. Zimmermann claims that the active ingredients are cultivated and harvested according to the wisdom of the traditional Chinese lunar calendar and each product is formulated using pure water from the source of the Yellow River.
