= Bell House, Coxwold =

Historic building in Coxwold, North Yorkshire, England

Coordinates: 54°11′14″N 1°10′56″W

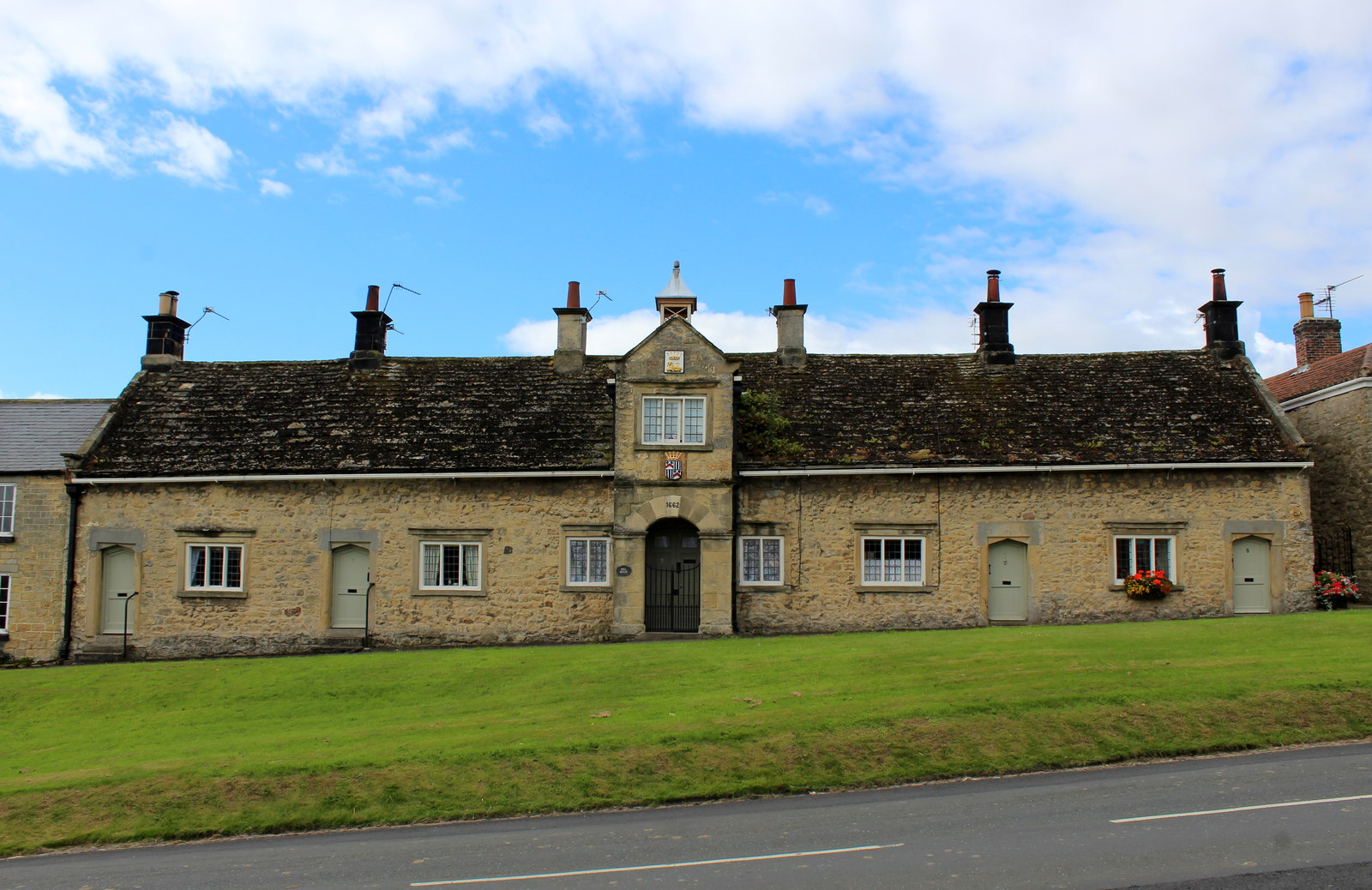
The building, in 2016

Bell House is a historic building in Coxwold, a village in North Yorkshire, in England.

An almshouse in Coxwold was first recorded in 1644, with an endowment from Thomas Belasyse, 1st Viscount Fauconberg. Fauconberg was on the losing side in the English Civil War, and the almshouse appears to have been dissolved. In 1662, his grandson, Thomas Belasyse, 1st Earl Fauconberg, founded a new almshouse in the village. It was for ten "poor aged and impotent men", and in 1696, he granted it an endowment of £59. He also founded an almshouse for women, but that was subsequently closed.

The almshouse became known as the Fauconberg Hospital, and the nearby Fauconberg Arms Inn is named after it. It was Grade II listed in 1952. In 1962, it was restored by Trenwith Wills, and redivided into five larger almshouses, known as "Bell House".

The building is constructed of stone, with a stone slate roof at the front, and a pantile roof at the rear, with stone coping and shaped kneelers. There is a single storey and seven bays, and a rear outshut. The middle bay projects as a porch and contains a segmental-arched opening with imposts and a dated keystone, above which is a string course and a coat of arms. Over this is a dormer containing a three-light window with a hood mould and a decorated panel, and recessed on the ridge is a timber bellcote. On the front are four triangular-headed doorways with chamfered surrounds, and six casement windows with hood moulds. In the rear outshut are four dormers.

== See also ==
- Listed buildings in Coxwold
