= Holy Trinity Church, Yearsley =

Church in Yearsley, North Yorkshire, England

Coordinates: 54.1618°N 1.1050°W

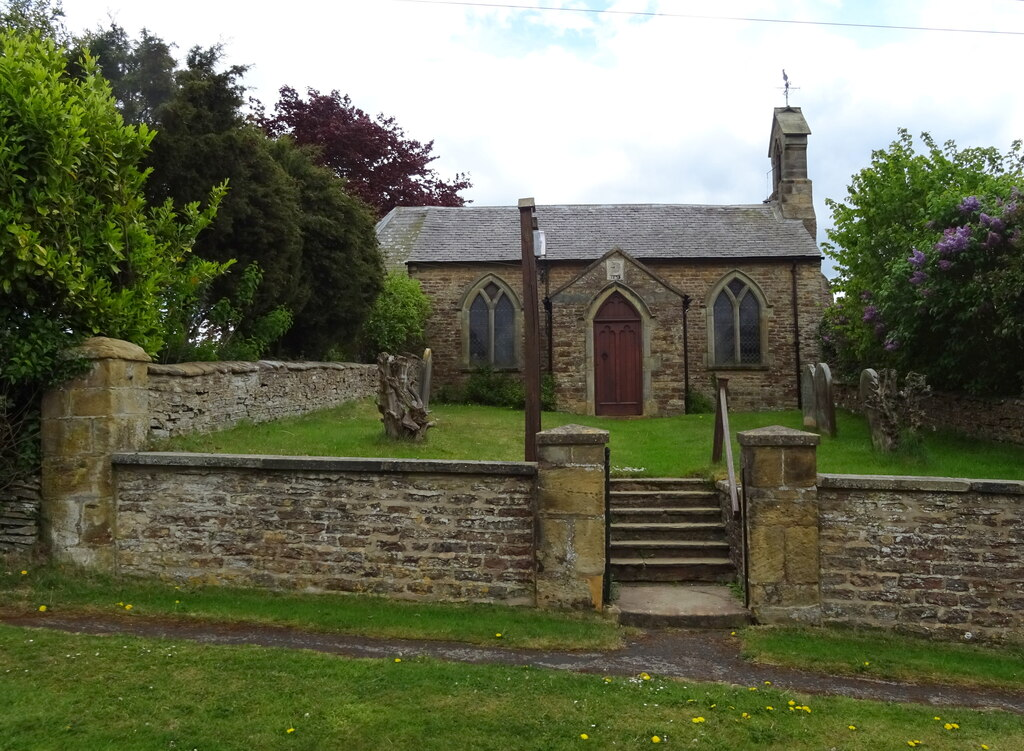
The church, in 2020

Holy Trinity Church is the parish church of Yearsley, a village in North Yorkshire, in England.

Yearsley was long in the parish of St Michael's Church, Coxwold. In 1839, a chapel of ease was constructed in the village, and it was finally given its own parish in 1960. The building was grade II listed in 1988.

The church is built of stone with a Welsh slate roof. It consists of a nave and a chancel with a polygonal apse under one roof, a north porch and a south vestry. On the west gable is a gabled bellcote corbelled out on buttresses. The porch is gabled, and contains a doorway with a chamfered surround, a pointed head and a hood mould, and above it is a recessed plaque with a unicorn's head and the date. The windows have Y-tracery. Inside, there is an altar rail dating from around 1700, a tub font, and a back rest to a pew converted from a 17th-century chest.

== See also ==
- Listed buildings in Yearsley
