= Yearsley =

Village and civil parish in North Yorkshire, England

Coordinates: 54.16336°N 1.10069°W

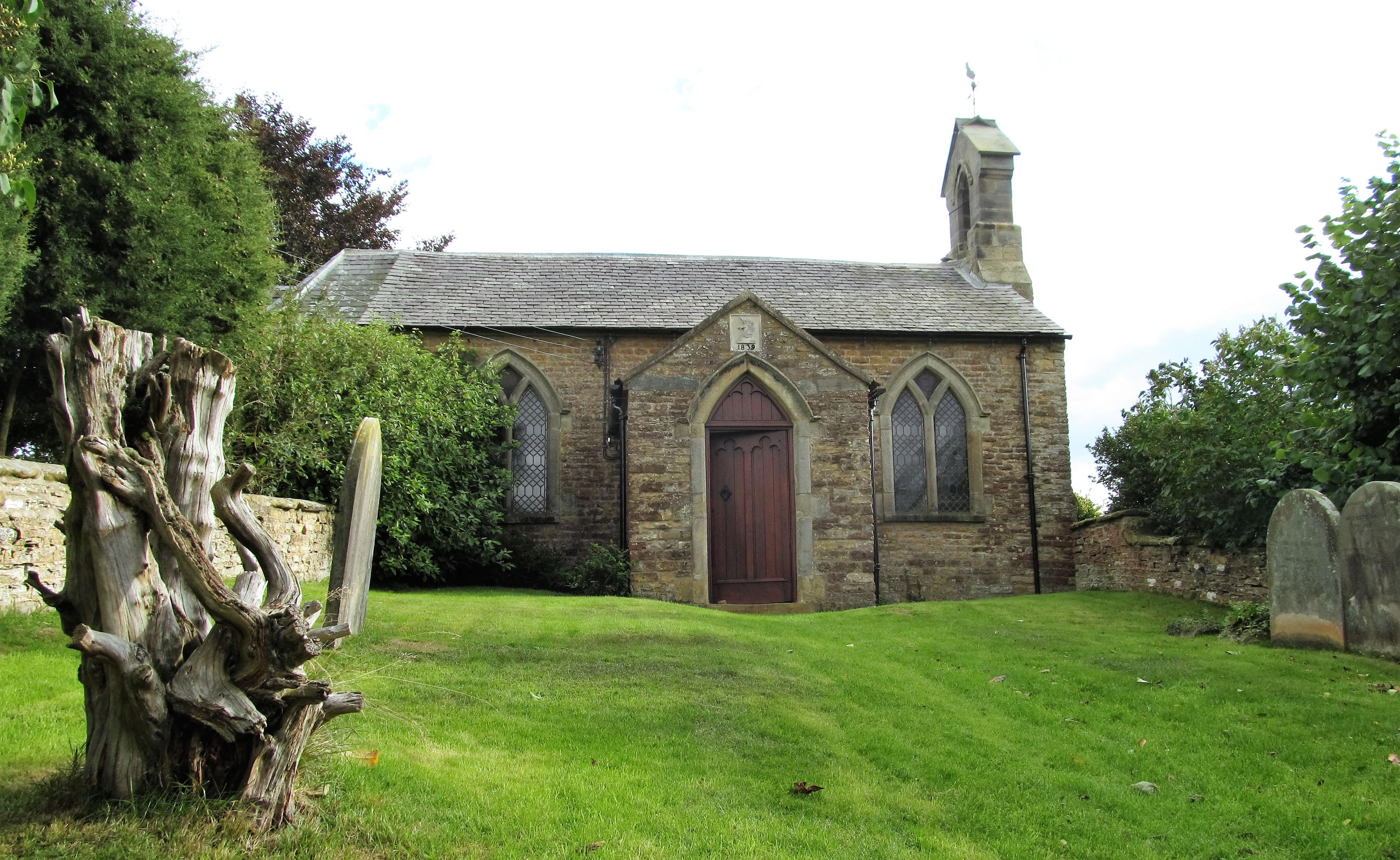
- Holy Trinity Church

- Location within North Yorkshire
- OS grid reference: SE588745
- Unitary authority: North Yorkshire
- Ceremonial county: North Yorkshire
- Region: Yorkshire and the Humber
- Country: England
- Sovereign state: United Kingdom
- Post town: York
- Postcode district: YO61
- Police: North Yorkshire
- Fire: North Yorkshire
- Ambulance: Yorkshire

Yearsley is a small village and civil parish in the county in North Yorkshire, England. The population of the civil parish was less than 100 at the 2011 Census. Details are included in the civil parish of Brandsby-cum-Stearsby. It is situated between the market towns of Easingwold and Helmsley.

From 1974 to 2023 it was part of the Hambleton District, it is now administered by the unitary North Yorkshire Council.

== History ==
The entire parish of Yearsley is within the Howardian Hills Area of Outstanding Natural Beauty. It was, and remains, a predominantly agricultural village with significant forestry on the moors to the north of the village.

The name 'Yearsley' is recorded in the Domesday Book as 'Eureslage' and then, in the Pipe Rolls of 1176, as 'Euereslai'. The origins of the name, however, are probably Anglo-Saxon, from a word meaning Boars' Wood. Following the Norman invasion, the lands of Yearsley fell into the hands of a Norman knight, Roger de Mowbray, who, by 1160, passed the estates to another Norman nobleman, Thomas Colville (from Colleville-sur-Mer on the Normandy coast). The heirs of Thomas Colville (also all called Thomas) owned the lands of Yearsley until 1398 when the next heir, William Colville, took the step of calling himself by the name of his English, rather than erstwhile Norman lands, and became William Yearsley. (Note: The source book used; Yearsley - The Early Yearsley Part 1, should be considered a Fictional History of the Surname. There may be references in the book that suggest a link to Gloucestershire and other parts of England from Yorkshire but, this is only a supposition. No Genealogical proven links have been made, only suggested. No yDNA links have been made. Use this book with caution and for reading purposes only and not as a solid base for Research of the Yearsley Surname.) The manorial estates of Yearsley passed to Sir William Yearsley (who was Clerk of the Wardrobe to Henry VI) and, in 1482, to a third heir, Thomas Yearsley, who died without male heirs in 1497. Through marriage, the estates of Yearsley then passed (by Thomas Yearsley's daughter, Thomasin) to William Wildon of Fryton.

Yearsley is the site of a number of barrows and other early earthworks. Yearsley was also the site of the pottery of William Wedgewood, a relation of the famous Staffordshire Wedgwood family of potters. The village was part of the Newburgh Priory estate of the Wombwell family until 1944.

Yearsley was part of the parish of Coxwold until it became an ecclesiastical parish in 1855 (although this was not sustained) and a civil parish in 1866.

The Pond Head reservoir between Yearsley and Oulston is fed from the nearby source of the River Foss.

Holy Trinity Church, Yearsley was built in 1839 as a chapel of ease to the Church of St Michael in Coxwold. It is a Grade II listed building.

== See also ==
- Listed buildings in Yearsley

== Notes and references ==
=== Other sources ===
- North Yorkshire Federations of Women's Institutes. The North Yorkshire Village Book. Countryside Books, Newbury, 1991. ISBN 1-85306-137-9
- Ryedale Gazette and Herald on Coxwold (and Yearsley), 07/01/2004
