= Coxwold =

Village and civil parish in North Yorkshire, England

Coordinates: 54°11′15″N 1°10′54″W

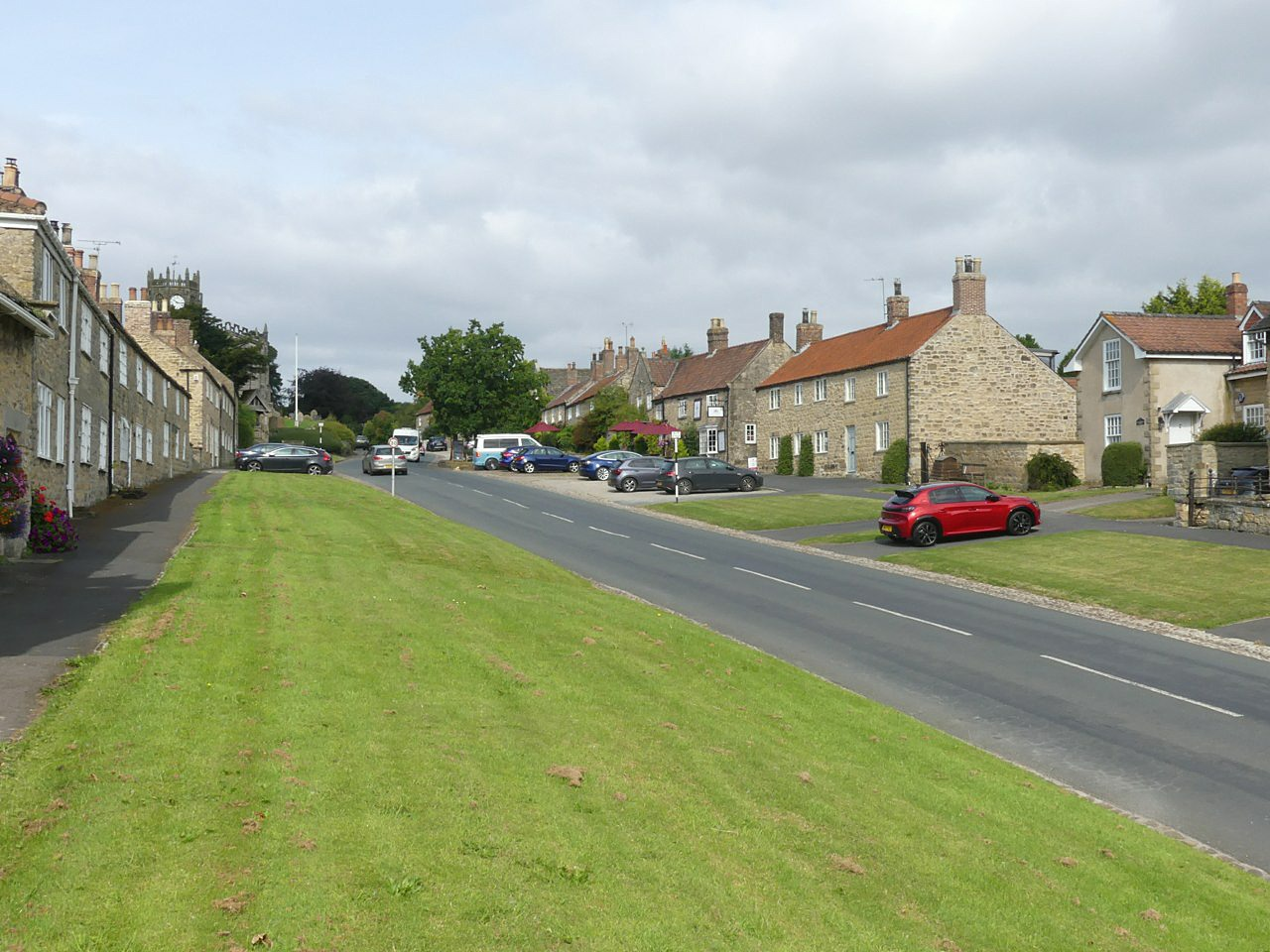
- Coxwold village looking up the hill towards St Michael's Church

- Location within North Yorkshire
- Population: 250 (using civil parish boundaries at 2021 census)
- OS grid reference: SE534771
- Civil parish: Coxwold
- Unitary authority: North Yorkshire
- Ceremonial county: North Yorkshire
- Region: Yorkshire and the Humber
- Country: England
- Sovereign state: United Kingdom
- Post town: YORK
- Postcode district: YO61
- Dialling code: 01347
- Police: North Yorkshire
- Fire: North Yorkshire
- Ambulance: Yorkshire
- UK Parliament: Thirsk and Malton

Coxwold is a village and civil parish in the county of North Yorkshire, England, in the North York Moors National Park. It is 18 miles (29 km) north of York and is where the Rev. Laurence Sterne wrote A Sentimental Journey.

== History ==
The village name is derived from Saxon words Cuc, meaning cry, and valt, meaning wood.

The village is mentioned in the Domesday Book of 1086 as part of the Yarlestre hundred by the name of Cucvalt. The lord of the manor at the time of the Norman Conquest in 1066 was Kofse but the manor passed to Hugh, son of Baldric, and thence to Roger de Mowbray. Before 1158 the manor and lands of Coxwold passed to Thomas de Colville. In return for the lands Thomas had to swear allegiance to Roger de Mowbray. Thomas de Colville's estate included the manors of Yearsley, Coxwold and Oulston as well as other properties and land in York, Thirsk, Everley, Nunwick, Kilburn and Upsland. The Colville shield is proudly displayed at one of the roof intersections in the twelfth-century Norman church in Coxwold.

Successive generations of Colvilles held the estate and lands of Coxwold until 1405 when the eighth Thomas Colville was murdered, probably on the instructions of Richard le Scrope, Archbishop of York, who, in turn, was acting on behalf of Henry Percy, 1st Earl of Northumberland. The bulk of the Coxwold estate was then granted to the Uhtred-Neville family.

While in possession of the Coxwold estate the Colville family made generous grants to Byland Abbey and Newburgh Priory but at the turn of the fourteenth century there were disputes between the monks of Newburgh Priory and the Colvilles over rights to land around Coxwold.

In 1304 the fifth Sir Thomas Colville started a tradition of a weekly market to be held in the grounds of the manor of Coxwold. He also established a two-day annual fair to celebrate the Assumption, a tradition that survived uninterrupted in Coxwold Manor for some five hundred years.

The seventh Sir Thomas Colville (of Yearsley and Coxwold) became famous following a jousting incident before the Battle of Crécy in 1346 when he crossed the river to joust with a French knight who had been hurling abuse at the English king. He later joined the retinue of John of Gaunt, the Duke of Lancaster, the third son of Edward III and by far the richest noble in England.

At one time the village had a station on the Thirsk and Malton Line. It opened on 19 May 1853 but closed on 7 August 1964 as part of the reorganisation of the national railway system. In 1603 Sir John Harte, who was born in nearby Kilburn, North Yorkshire, built a grammar school in the village, which closed in 1894. He was also a Lord Mayor of London.

== Governance ==
Coxwold is in the Thirsk and Malton UK Parliament constituency.

From 1974 to 2023 it was part of the Hambleton District. It is now administered by the unitary North Yorkshire Council.

A new Coxwold village website was launched in 2018.

== Geography ==
Most of the buildings in the village are on a slight incline, with the church at the top. At the bottom of the hill was the village smithy, now a holiday cottage. The Fauconberg Arms Inn is on the main street. It bears the arms and motto of Baron Fauconberg and offers accommodation and a restaurant.

According to the 1881 UK Census the population was 313. The 2001 UK Census put the population of the wider civil parish at 265.

The nearest villages to Coxwold are Husthwaite 1.6 miles (2.6 km) to the south-west, Carlton Husthwaite 2.4 miles (3.9 km) to the west, Kilburn 2 miles (3.2 km) to the north-west, Wass 1.7 miles (2.7 km) to the north-east and Oulston 1.6 miles (2.6 km) to the south-south-east.

Green's Beck runs south-westwards through the village to join Mill Beck, form Elphin Beck and eventually flow into the River Swale.

== Education ==
The village had a primary school from 1863 until 1974. It is in the primary-education catchment area of Husthwaite Church of England School and in the secondary-education catchment area of Easingwold School.

== Religion ==
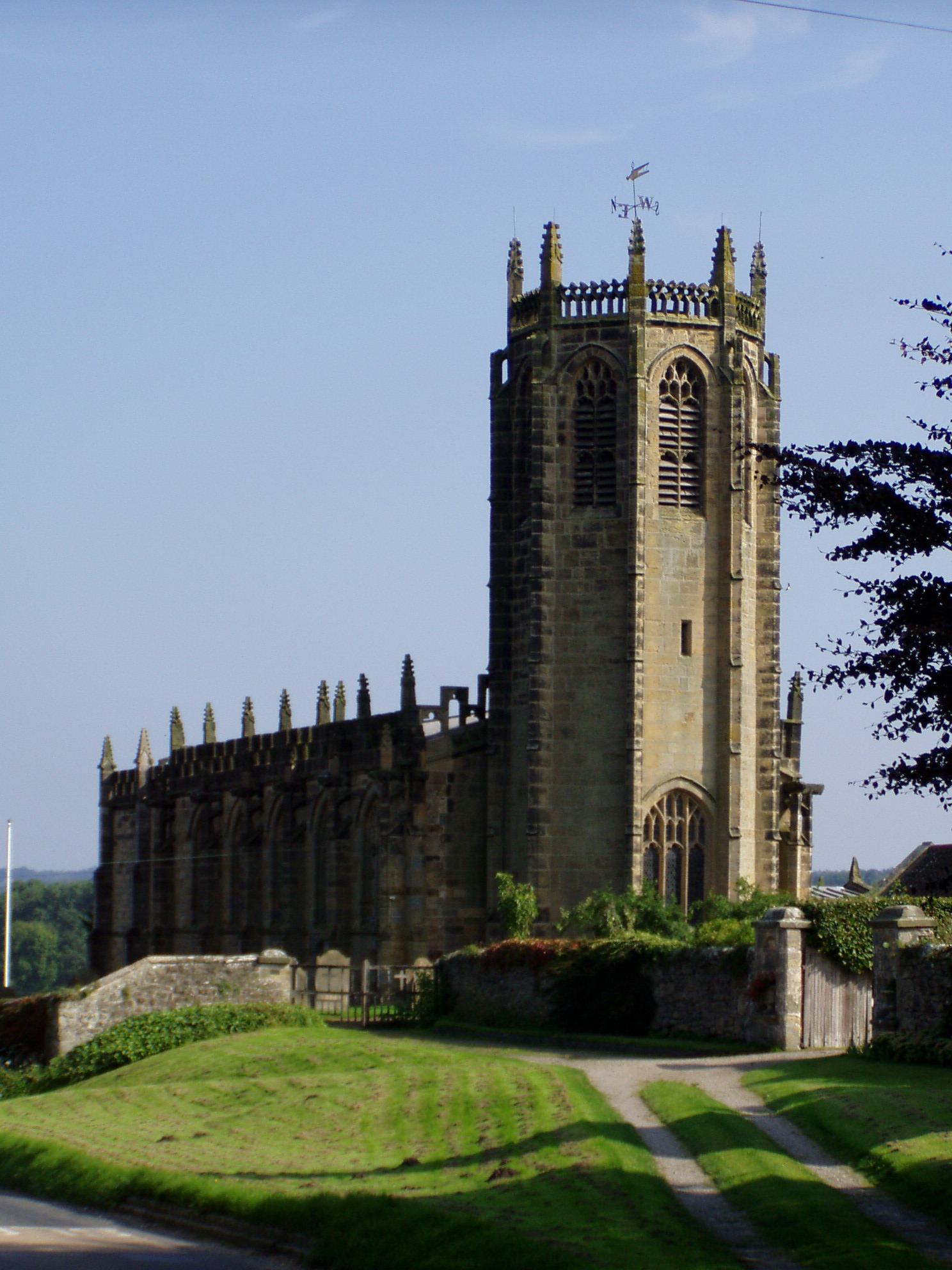
St Michael's Church, Coxwold

Since 700 AD Coxwold has had a church at the top of the hill. The present church was built in 1420 in the Perpendicular style with an unusual octagonal west tower and is dedicated to St Michael. The chancel features a unique tongue-shaped communion rail (early 18th century). Laurence Sterne was appointed vicar in 1760.

== Notable residents ==
The Rev. Laurence Sterne lived at Shandy Hall from 1760 to 1768 and the house was named by him. Shandy Hall is on Thirsk Bank at the north-western end of the village and was originally built in 1430 as a parsonage for Coxwold's village priest. It is a small brick building with a mossy, stone-covered roof, wide gables and massive chimney-stacks. It was originally a timber-framed open-hall house but was considerably altered in the 17th century. The stone tablet above the doorway states that Sterne wrote Tristram Shandy and A Sentimental Journey at Shandy Hall. This is not entirely accurate, for two (of the nine) volumes of Tristram Shandy had already been published in 1759 before Sterne moved to Coxwold.

Sir George Orby Wombwell, 4th Baronet and the last surviving officer of the Charge of the Light Brigade, is buried in the village churchyard. In more recent times the village was the home to the Coxwold Pottery, run by Peter & Jill Dick.

== Notable buildings ==
To the south of the village is Newburgh Priory, a Grade I listed stately home built on the site of a former Augustinian priory. The original priory was built in 1145 by Roger de Mowbray but fell victim to the Dissolution of the Monasteries instigated by King Henry VIII. The King sold the estate to Anthony de Bellasis, whose family took the name of Fauconberg when the baronetcy was created. The estate passed to the Wombwell family in 1825 at the end of the male line and remains in their possession today.

To the north of the village are the ruins of Byland Abbey, a Grade I listed building, which was founded in the 12th century by Savigniac monks.

In the village are Bell House, almshouses dating from 1662, and The Old Hall, a former school built about 1600.

== See also ==
- Listed buildings in Coxwold
