= Listed buildings in Yearsley =

Yearsley is a civil parish in the county of North Yorkshire, England. It contains two listed buildings that are recorded in the National Heritage List for England. Both the listed buildings are designated at Grade II, the lowest of the three grades, which is applied to "buildings of national importance and special interest". The parish contains the village of Yearsley and the surrounding area. Both the listed buildings are in the village, and consist of a house and a church.

== Buildings ==
Name and location	Photograph	Date	Notes
Former Wombwell Arms; 54.16320°N 1.10187°W		Early to mid-19th century	A public house, later a private house, it is in sandstone, and has a tile roof with shaped kneelers and stone coping. There are two storeys and three bays. The central doorway has a four-centred arch, a fanlight with decorative glazing, and a small canopy. The windows are sashes with wedge lintels.
Holy Trinity Church; 54.16186°N 1.10511°W		1839	The church is in stone with a Welsh slate roof. It consists of a nave and a chancel with a polygonal apse under one roof, a north porch and a south vestry. On the west gable is a gabled bellcote corbelled out on buttresses. The porch is gabled, and contains a doorway with a chamfered surround, a pointed head and a hood mould, and above it is a recessed plaque with a unicorn's head and the date. The windows have Y-tracery.
