= Listed buildings in Oulston =

Oulston is a civil parish in the county of North Yorkshire, England. It contains five listed buildings that are recorded in the National Heritage List for England. All the listed buildings are designated at Grade II, the lowest of the three grades, which is applied to "buildings of national importance and special interest". The parish contains the village of Oulston and the surrounding countryside. The listed buildings consist of a former hunting lodge and cottage, a farmhouse and barns, a lodge and a gateway, and a cottage.

== Buildings ==
Name and location	Photograph	Date	Notes
Mount House; 54.16821°N 1.14790°W		Early to mid-18th century	A former hunting lodge, with a later cottage attached, in sandstone with Westmorland slate roofs. The lodge has two storeys, fronts of one bay and a hipped roof. It has a plinth, chamfered rusticated quoins, a sill band and a moulded cornice. On the front is a full-height round arch containing a round-arched window with projecting imposts and a keystone on the ground floor, and a casement window above. The cottage to the right has two lower storeys, and contains a doorway with a fanlight, and horizontally-sliding sash windows.
Pond Head Farmhouse and barns 54.16364°N 1.13359°W		Mid-18th century	The farmhouse is in rendered brick at the front and sandstone at the rear, the barns are in stone with some brick, and they all have pantile roofs with shaped kneelers and stone coping. The farmhouse has two storeys and an attic, and three bays. In the centre is a doorway with a fanlight, and projecting imposts and a keystone. The windows are sashes, those on the upper floor horizontally-sliding. The left barn has two storeys, and both barns have three bays. The barns contain various openings, the right barn has brick panels, and on the left barn are external steps.
Gateway to Newburgh Park; 54.16674°N 1.15944°W	—	Mid to late 18th century	The gateway adjacent to Oulston Lodge has rusticated sandstone piers with chamfered bases and tabled capstones. The gates are in wrought iron. The flanking low walls have canted copings, and wrought iron railings with arrow-head finials, and turned-baluster standards with urn finials.
Oulston Lodge; 54.16683°N 1.15950°W	—	Mid to late 18th century	The lodge to Newburgh Park is in sandstone, with a cornice and a hipped Westmorland slate roof. There is a single story and three bays, the middle bay projecting as a semicircular bow. This has a plinth and contains two sash windows. The outer bays are rendered and contain blocked windows.
Cottage south of the village hall 54.16339°N 1.16356°W		Early 19th century (probable)	The cottage is in sandstone, and has a pantile roof with shaped kneelers and stone coping. There are two storeys and one bay. On the left is a doorway, on each floor is a horizontally-sliding sash window, and all the openings have deep lintels.
