= The Old Hall, Coxwold =

Historic building in Coxwold, North Yorkshire, England

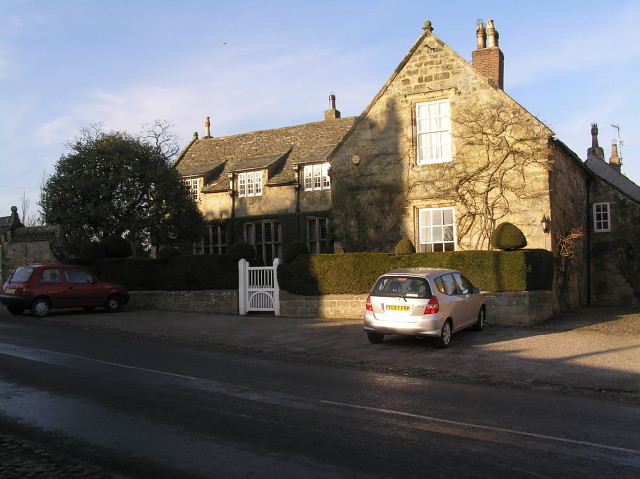
The building, in 2008

The Old Hall is a historic building in Coxwold, a village in North Yorkshire, in England.

The building was constructed in 1603, to house a free grammar school, founded by John Harte, a local man who had served as Lord Mayor of London. In about 1725, a house for the schoolmaster was added, incorporating a kitchen and dining room for the schoolboys. In the late 19th century, a rear wing was added and dormer windows added to the roof. The school closed in 1894, and the building was converted into a private house. There were further alterations in the 20th century, and in 1952 the building was grade II listed.

The building is constructed of sandstone, with roofs of stone slate and pantile, and a single storey with attics. The former schoolroom is the main range, parallel to the road, and the master's house projects to the front at right angles. The main range has four bays, a staircase turret at the rear. The doorway has four bays, a moulded surround, a Tudor arched head and a hood mould, over which is a string course and a coat of arms. In the ground floor are mullioned and transomed windows, and in the attic are dormers with sashes. In the wing is a doorway with a chamfered surround and a sash window, both with hood moulds, and in the attic are dormers. Inside are the two former schoolrooms. The newer retains its 19th-century panelling, but the panelling of the older one was removed to Newburgh Priory when the school closed. There is also a stone inscription recording the endowment of the school in 1600.

== See also ==
- Listed buildings in Coxwold
