= Oulston =

Village and civil parish in North Yorkshire, England

Coordinates: 54.162606°N 1.163629°W

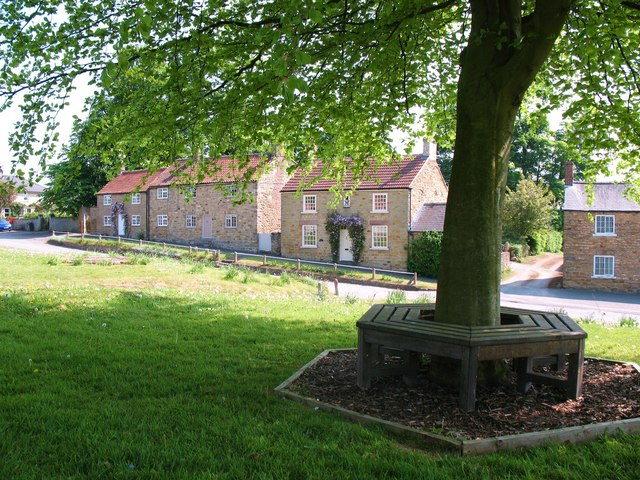
- Village Green in Oulston, North Yorkshire

- Location within North Yorkshire
- Population: 149 (Including Thornton-on-the-Hill. 2011 census)
- OS grid reference: SE 5471 7441
- Civil parish: Oulston
- Unitary authority: North Yorkshire
- Ceremonial county: North Yorkshire
- Region: Yorkshire and the Humber
- Country: England
- Sovereign state: United Kingdom
- Post town: YORK
- Postcode district: YO61
- Police: North Yorkshire
- Fire: North Yorkshire
- Ambulance: Yorkshire
- UK Parliament: Thirsk and Malton

Oulston is a village and civil parish in the county of North Yorkshire, England. It lies about 3 miles (5 km) north-east of Easingwold. Remains of a Roman villa have been found in the area. The village is within the Howardian Hills Area of Outstanding Natural Beauty

== History ==
The village name may be derived from the Anglian personal name of Ulf combined with tun meaning habitation.

There are the remains of a Roman villa nearby, consistent with the village's location near the junction of two old Roman roads. Articles from the site are located within the York Museum.

The village is mentioned in the Domesday Book as Uluestan and at the time of the Norman invasion, the lands were owned by Gospatric, son Arnketil. Following the Norman invasion of Britain, the estates of Yearsley, Coxwold and Oulston fell into the hands of a Norman family whose previous seat of power had been in Montbray, Normandy. By 1158, however, these same lands had been given to another Norman lord whose family base had been Colleville on the Normandy coast. In return for receiving these lands, Thomas de Colville had to swear allegiance to Roger de Mowbray. Thomas de Colville's estate included the manors of Yearsley, Coxwold and Oulston as well as other properties and land in York, Thirsk, Everley, Nunwick, Ripon, Kilburn and Upsland. The Colville shield is proudly displayed at one of the roof intersections in the twelfth century Norman church at Coxwold. A fourth Thomas Colville generously allowed John, the Prior of Newburgh, to live “by suit of court” in his manor house at Oulston. In return for Thomas's generosity, John (besides offering prayers) used his influence, in 1256, to arrange a special privilege for Thomas: Thomas would no longer be required, on behalf of the king, to carry out any legal or other administrative duties against his will. The lands were eventually passed to the Fauconberg family and thence to the Wombwell family, who resided at nearby Newburgh Priory Estate.

There used to be a Wesleyan chapel in the village, which is now the village hall. It is a Grade II listed building.

There are four sites in the area that are scheduled ancient monuments. They are:

- a round barrow 500m WNW of Pond Head Farm at grid reference SE56207470
- a round barrow 350m NW of Pond Head Farm at grid reference SE56377475
- a section of cross ridge dyke and earthworks in Roman Plantation, Oulston Moor at grid reference SE56387489
- a section of cross ridge dyke and hollow way 200m NW of Pond Head Farm at grid reference SE56447472

== Governance ==
The village is part of the Thirsk and Malton UK Parliament constituency. From 1974 to 2023 it was part of the Hambleton District, it is now administered by the unitary North Yorkshire Council.

== Geography ==
According to the 1881 UK census, the population was 177. In the 2001 UK census the population was 102 of which 85 were over sixteen years old. Of those, 51 were in employment.

Oulston lends its name to the reservoir on the River Foss to the east of the village.

The nearest settlements to Oulston are Crayke 2.7 miles (4.3 km) to the south; Husthwaite 1.9 miles (3.1 km) to the west; Coxwold 1.6 miles (2.6 km) to the north and Yearsley 2.4 miles (3.9 km) to the east.

== See also ==
- Listed buildings in Oulston
