= Listed buildings in Coxwold =

Coxwold is a civil parish in the county of North Yorkshire, England. It contains 14 listed buildings that are recorded in the National Heritage List for England. Of these, two are listed at Grade I, the highest of the three grades, and the others are at Grade II, the lowest grade. The parish contains the village of Coxwold and the surrounding area, and all the listed buildings are in the village. Most of these are houses and associated structures, and the others include a church, a memorial tombstone and a war memorial in the churchyard, and a row of almshouses.

== Key ==
Grade	Criteria
I	Buildings of exceptional interest, sometimes considered to be internationally important
II	Buildings of national importance and special interest

== Buildings ==
Name and location	Photograph	Date	Notes	Grade
St Michael's Church; 54.18783°N 1.18471°W		c. 1430	The chancel was rebuilt in 1774 by Thomas Atkinson. The church is built in sandstone with lead roofs, and is in Perpendicular style. It consists of a nave, a south porch, a chancel and a west tower. The tower is octagonal, with a staircase turret in the south angle, and angle buttresses with gablets and detached square shafts above, linked to the tower by short flying buttresses. There is a three-light west window with Perpendicular tracery, vents in the ringing chamber, two-light bell openings, a clock on the east side, foliated pinnacles surmounting the buttresses, and an openwork parapet with cinquefoiled ogee-headed openings. In the centre of the roof is a weathervane. Along the nave and the chancel are pierced embattled parapets and pinnacles.	I
Shandy Hall; 54.18867°N 1.18752°W		c. 1450	A timber framed hall house that was later encased in brick, and subsequently converted into a museum. It has a roof of stone slate, and consists of a hall range with one storey, attics and an outshut, and flanking gabled two-storey cross-wings. Above the doorway is an inscription, and the windows are sashes in openings with brick segmental arches. At the rear, some of the sash windows are horizontally-sliding. The house was the home of Laurence Sterne and is now a museum to his life and work.	I
The Old Hall; 54.18813°N 1.18405°W		1600	A school and schoolmaster's house with later alterations. The school closed in 1894, and it has been converted into a private house. This is in sandstone, with roofs of stone slate and pantile, and a single storey with attics. The former schoolroom is the main range, parallel to the road, and the master's house projects to the front at right angles. The main range has four bays, a staircase turret at the rear. The doorway has four bays, a moulded surround, a Tudor arched head and a hood mould, over which is a string course and a coat of arms. In the ground floor are mullioned and transomed windows, and in the attic are dormers with sashes. In the wing is a doorway with a chamfered surround and a sash window, both with hood moulds, and in the attic are dormers.	II
Colville Hall; 54.18772°N 1.18562°W	—	Early 17th century	Part of a former manor house, later a private house, in sandstone with a tile roof. There are two storeys, and an east front of four bays. The second bay projects, and the first and second bays are gabled with moulded coping and ball finials. The windows are a mix, and include fixed lights, a sash window, and double-chamfered mullioned windows, some with hood moulds. At the rear is a massive chimney stack with diagonally-set chimneys, and a pantile roof.	II
Gate piers, Colville Hall; 54.18799°N 1.18529°W	—	Early 17th century (probable)	The gate piers flanking the entrance to the drive are in sandstone. They have a square plan, and each pier contains a moulded shell niche, set in a panel with ogee moulding and sunken spandrels. They are surmounted by bow-shaped caps.	II
The Manor House; 54.18752°N 1.18587°W	—	Early 17th century	Part of a former manor house, later a farmhouse, in sandstone with a pantile roof, stone coping, shaped kneelers and a ball finial on the right. There are two storeys, a south front of four bays, and a rear wing. The doorway has a timber trellis porch, and the windows are a mix of casements, and double-chamfered mullioned windows.	II
Wall and archway, The Old Hall; 54.18804°N 1.18424°W		Early 17th century	The wall is in sandstone with moulded coping, and it extends for about 20 metres (66 ft) along the front of the garden. It contains a pair of gate piers with rounded tops. To their right is an archway with a moulded surround, a Tudor arched head and a hood mould. Above this is ridged coping with a central sundial and end ball finials.	II
Almshouses; 54.18733°N 1.18231°W		1662	Originally the Fauconberg Hospital, later a row of five almshouses, in stone, with a stone slate roof at the front, and a pantile roof at the rear, with stone coping and shaped kneelers. There is a single storey and seven bays, and a rear outshut. The middle bay projects as a porch and contains a segmental-arched opening with imposts and a dated keystone, above which is a string course and a coat of arms. Over this is a dormer containing a three-light window with a hood mould and a decorated panel, and recessed on the ridge is a timber bellcote. On the front are four triangular-headed doorways with chamfered surrounds, and six casement windows with hood moulds. In the rear outshut are four dormers.	II
Alma House and railings 54.18798°N 1.18375°W	—	Late 17th to early 18th century	The house is in sandstone, with quoins, and a concrete tile roof with stone coping and shaped kneelers. There are two storeys and three bays. In the centre is a trellised porch, and the windows are sashes. Enclosing the garden is a low stone wall with segmental coping, cast iron railings with arrow finials and twisted standards, and gate posts of turned balusters with acanthus bud bases.	II
Ivy House and railings 54.18794°N 1.18360°W	—	Late 17th to early 18th century	The house is in sandstone, and has a pantile roof with stone coping on the right. There are two storeys and three bays. The ground floor windows have flat arches with stone voussoirs. Enclosing the garden is a low stone wall with segmental coping, cast iron railings with arrow finials and twisted standards, and gate posts with rosette panels.	II
Hillcrest and Maxwell House; 54.18812°N 1.18458°W	—	Mid 18th century	The cottage was added later to the left of the house. They are in stone, and have a pantile roof with stone coping and a ball finial on the left. There are two storeys, four bays, and a rear outshut around a central turret. The central doorway has a timber canopy, and the windows are sashes, some of them horizontally-sliding.	II
Sterne Memorial; 54.18779°N 1.18467°W		c. 1768	The memorial is a tombstone in the churchyard of St Michael's Church by the south wall of the nave. It consists of a white stone slab with a wave-shaped head, and on it is a long inscription.	II
Elphin House; 54.18757°N 1.18184°W	—	Early to mid 19th century	The house, which was extended on each side in 1894, is in sandstone with a pantile roof on the original part and a Welsh slate roof on the right extension, and with stone coping and shaped kneelers. There are two storeys, the original part with three bays, the extension to the right with one bay, and the extension to the left with a single storey and two bays. The doorway is round-arched, with a fanlight, and a canopy on concave corbels with paterae. The windows on the original part and the right extension are sashes. In the left extension is a coped parapet, a round-headed doorway and window, and a Diocletian window above.	II
War memorial 54.18778°N 1.18415°W		1919	The First World War memorial is in the churchyard of St Michael's Church, and was designed by Temple Moore. It is in sandstone, and consists of a cross with cusped arms and a tapering octagonal shaft. This stands on a plinth, octagonal at the base and square at the top, on a base of three steps. On the plinth and steps is an inscription in Gothic script.	II
