= Fauconberg Arms Inn =

Pub in North Yorkshire, England

Fauconberg Arms
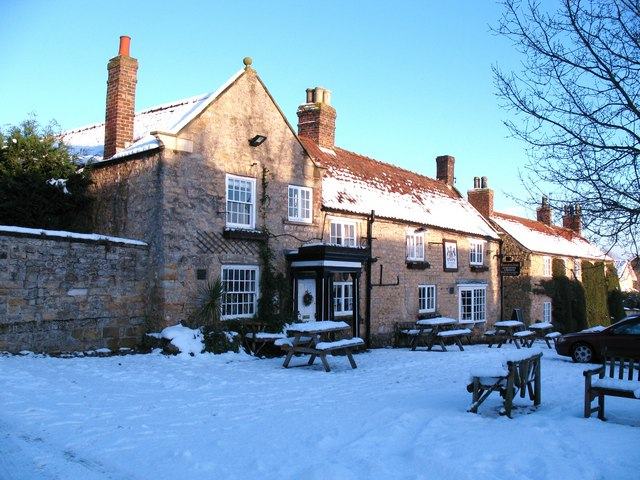
- The pub in 2009

- Location within North Yorkshire

General information
- Location: Coxwold near York, North Yorkshire, England
- Coordinates: 54°11′16″N 1°10′57″W

Website
- fauconbergarms.com

The Fauconberg Arms is a 17th-century coaching inn in Coxwold, a village in North Yorkshire, England. The village and estate were given to the Fauconberg family by Henry VIII. The property is still owned by the Newburgh Priory Estate and is named after the Earl of Fauconberg. It serves beer and a selection of food and is close to Shandy Hall and the Kilburn White Horse.

The Fauconberg Arms re-opened in November 2006 after being closed for almost two years. The proprietors refurbished the pub's bar, cellar, dining room and kitchens. The renovated en-suite B&B bedrooms reopened in spring 2007.

The inn was highly commended in Yorkshire Pub of the Year 2013, and received a good review from The Yorkshire Post (Pub of the Week) in April 2013, but a November 2014 review thought little of the cuisine.

== Performing arts ==
The Fauconberg Arms has hosted a number of performances of plays and other performing arts. Alexander Wright's Beuleh was performed in September 2012. The Little Festival of Everything, a free performance weekend, was hosted in May 2014.

In July 2014 two one-act plays by Alan Stockdale, Godfrey's Last Stand and Give A Little Love were performed for Macmillan Cancer Support.
