= Shandy Hall =

Grade I listed house in North Yorkshire, England

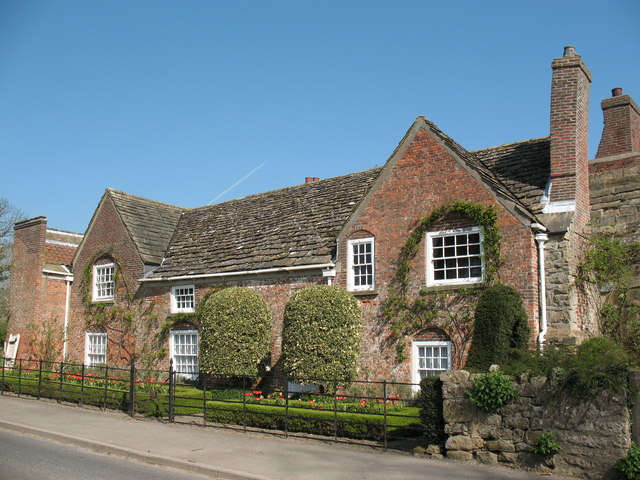
- Shandy Hall from the main road

- Location within North Yorkshire
- Established: 1968
- Coordinates: 54.188650°N 1.187500°W
- Type: Historic house
- Key holdings: First editions of Laurence Sterne's works
- Curator: Patrick Wildgust

Shandy Hall is a writer's house museum in the former home of the Rev. Laurence Sterne in Coxwold, North Yorkshire, England. Sterne lived there from 1760 to 1768 as perpetual curate of Coxwold. He is remembered for his novels The Life and Opinions of Tristram Shandy, Gentleman and A Sentimental Journey Through France and Italy.

== Architectural history ==
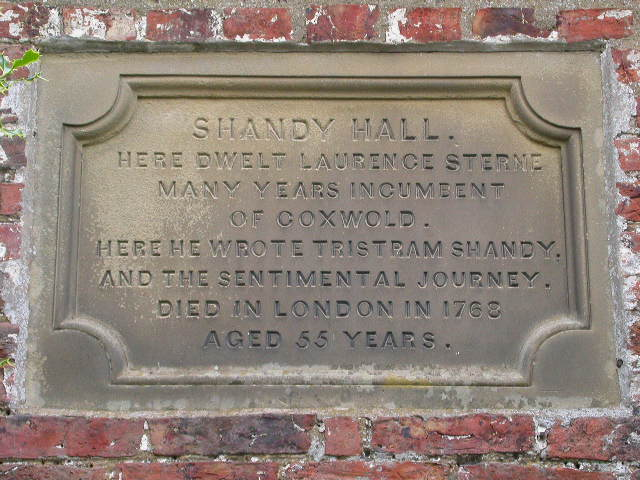
Plaque commemorating Laurence Sterne at Shandy Hall

The extant buildings result from three major phases of building: a medieval long hall built for the local priest around 1430; this was extended in the 17th century and then significantly altered by Sterne with the income from his novels. A stone tablet above its doorway states that Sterne wrote Tristram Shandy and A Sentimental Journey at Shandy Hall. This is not entirely accurate, for two volumes of Tristram Shandy had already been published in 1759 before Sterne moved to Coxwold.

The house is a Grade I listed building. It was extended and altered internally for Sterne and subject to restoration in 1960. The Hall is now administered by the Laurence Sterne Trust, a registered charity, and is open to the public. Shandy Hall featured in the 2006 film A Cock and Bull Story, which was based on Sterne's book Tristram Shandy.

== See also ==
- Grade I listed buildings in North Yorkshire (district)
- Listed buildings in Coxwold

== Gallery ==
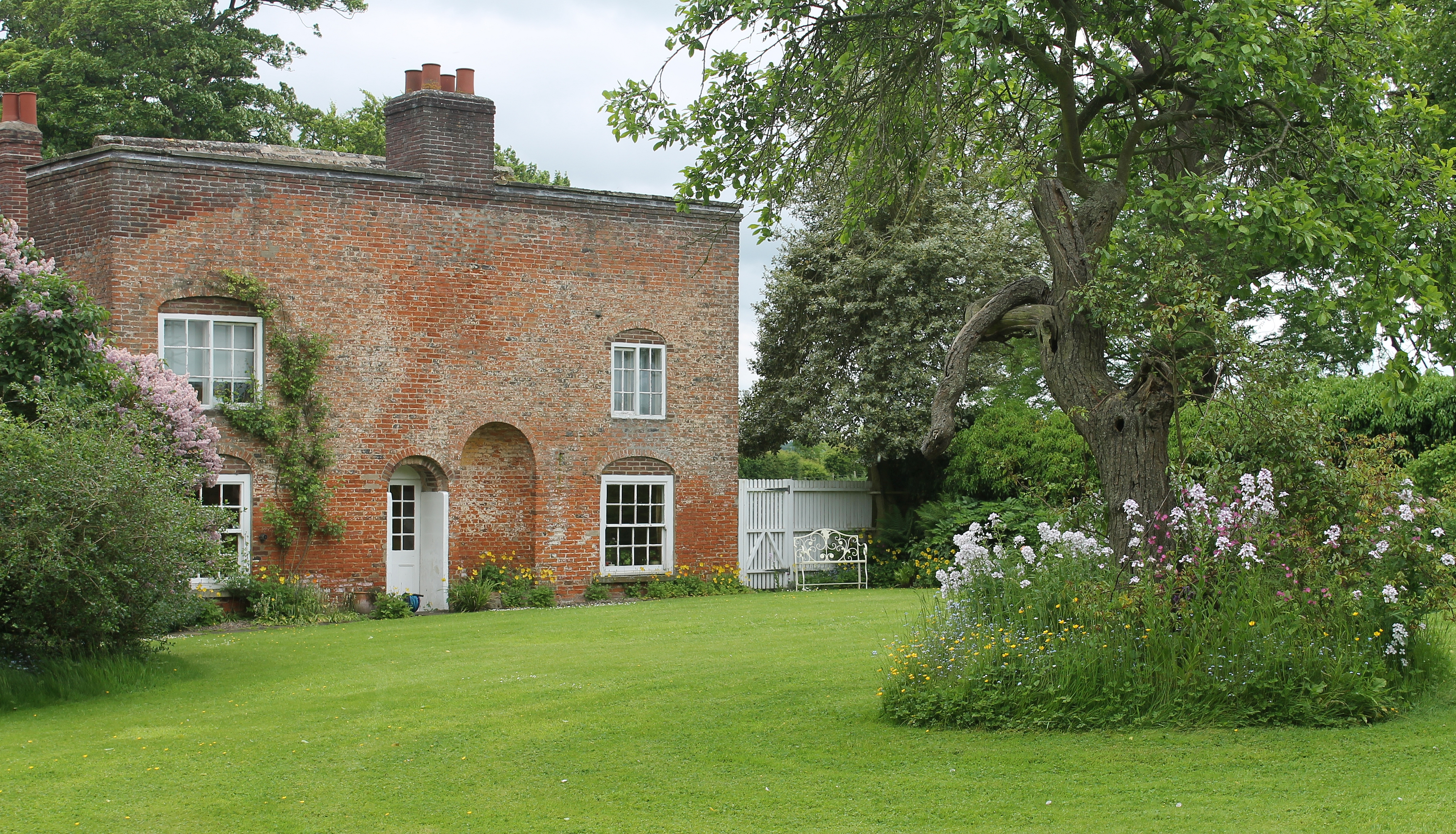
West entrance of Shandy Hall

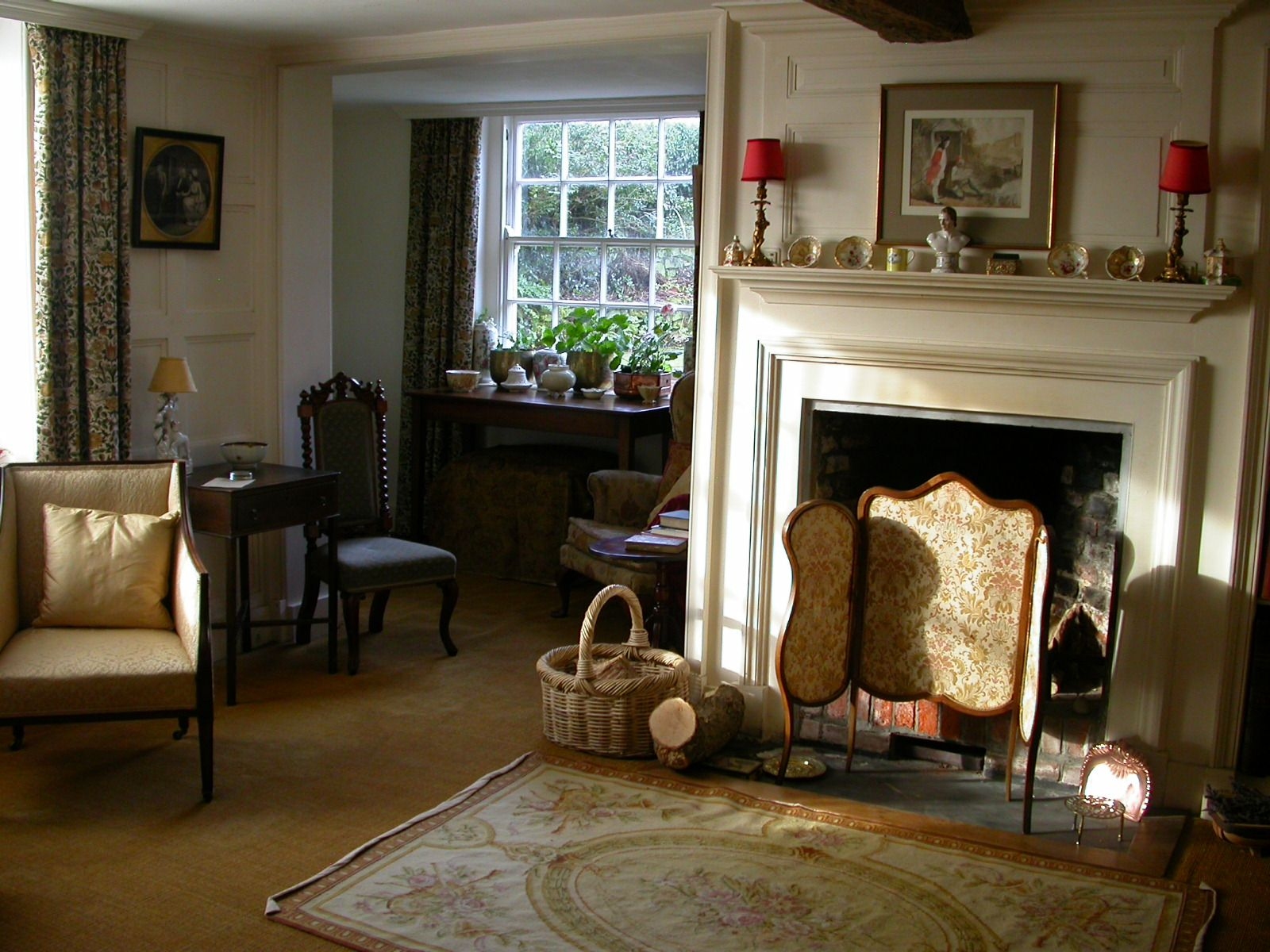
The Parlour

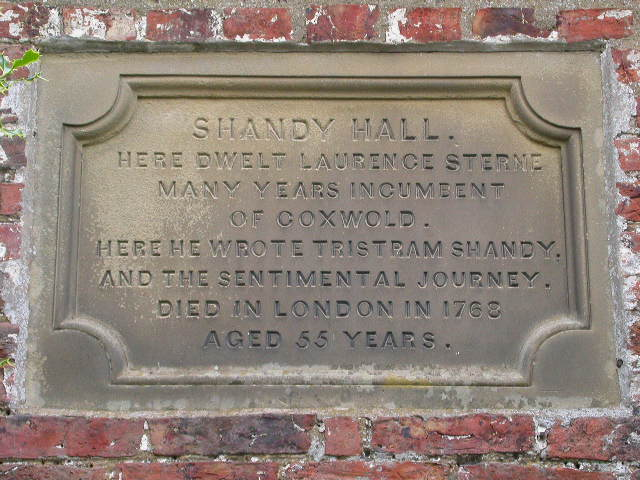
Plaque commemorating the writer Laurence Sterne

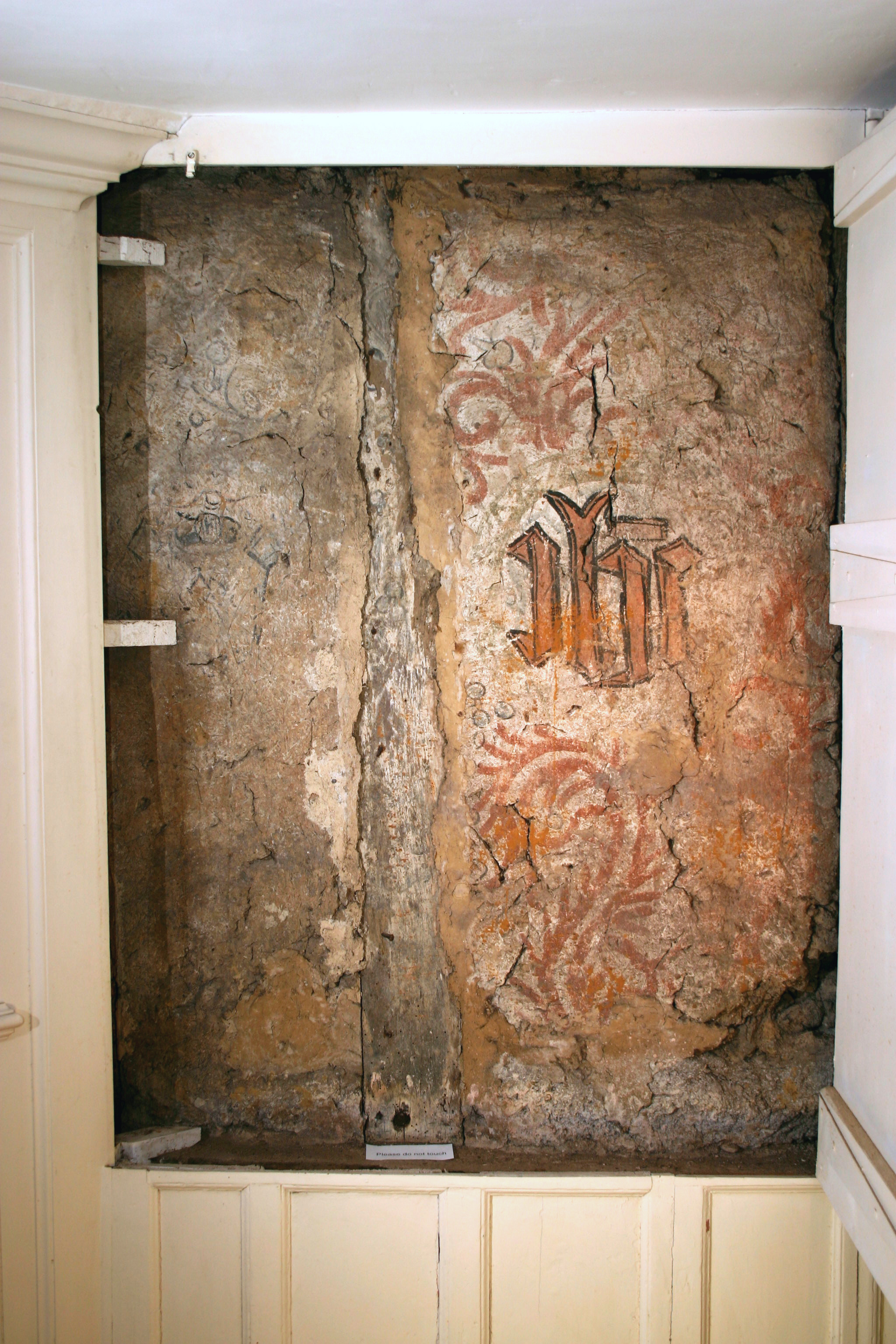
Medieval wall paintings behind later wood panelling in Shandy Hall's parlour

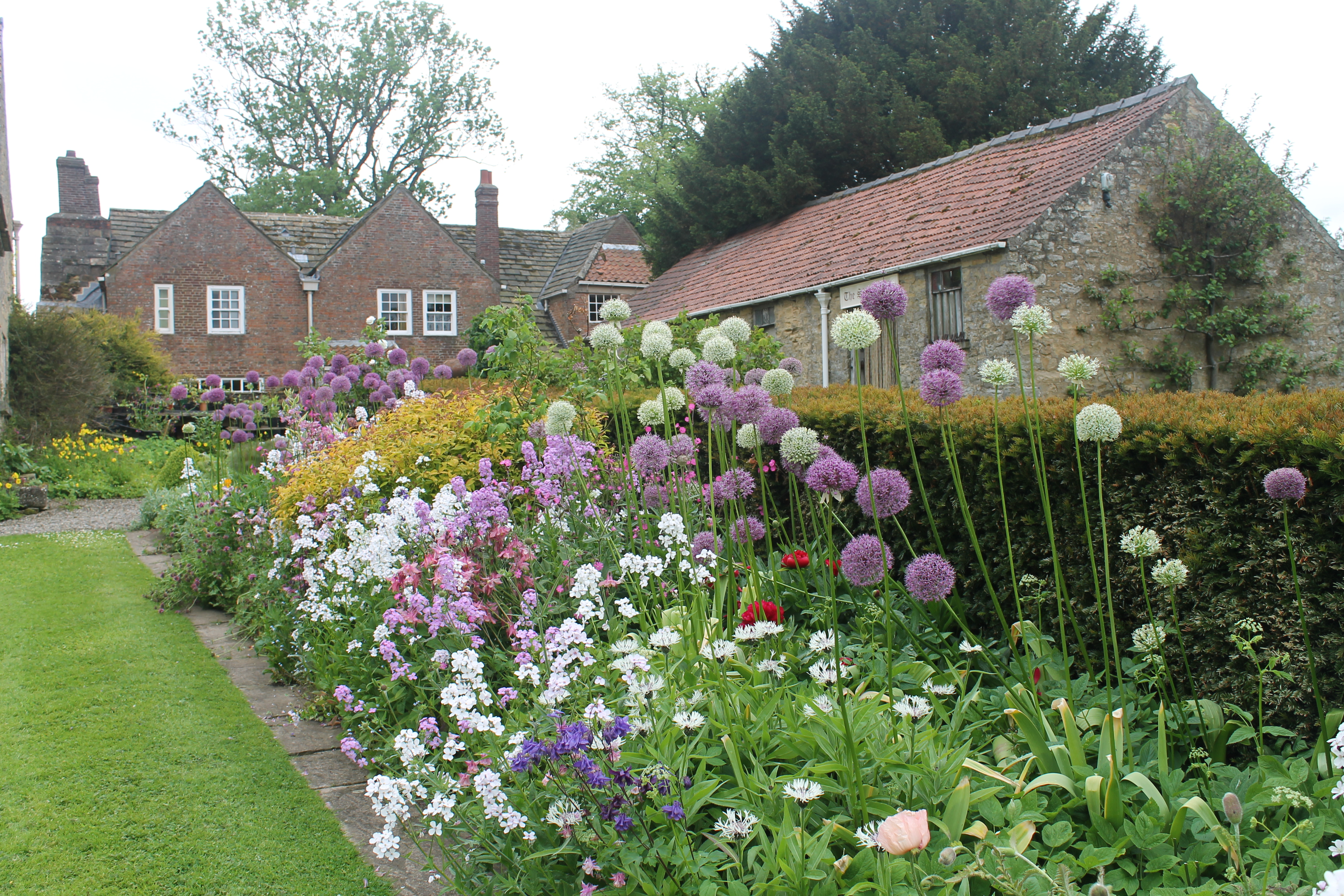
The formal gardens behind the hall

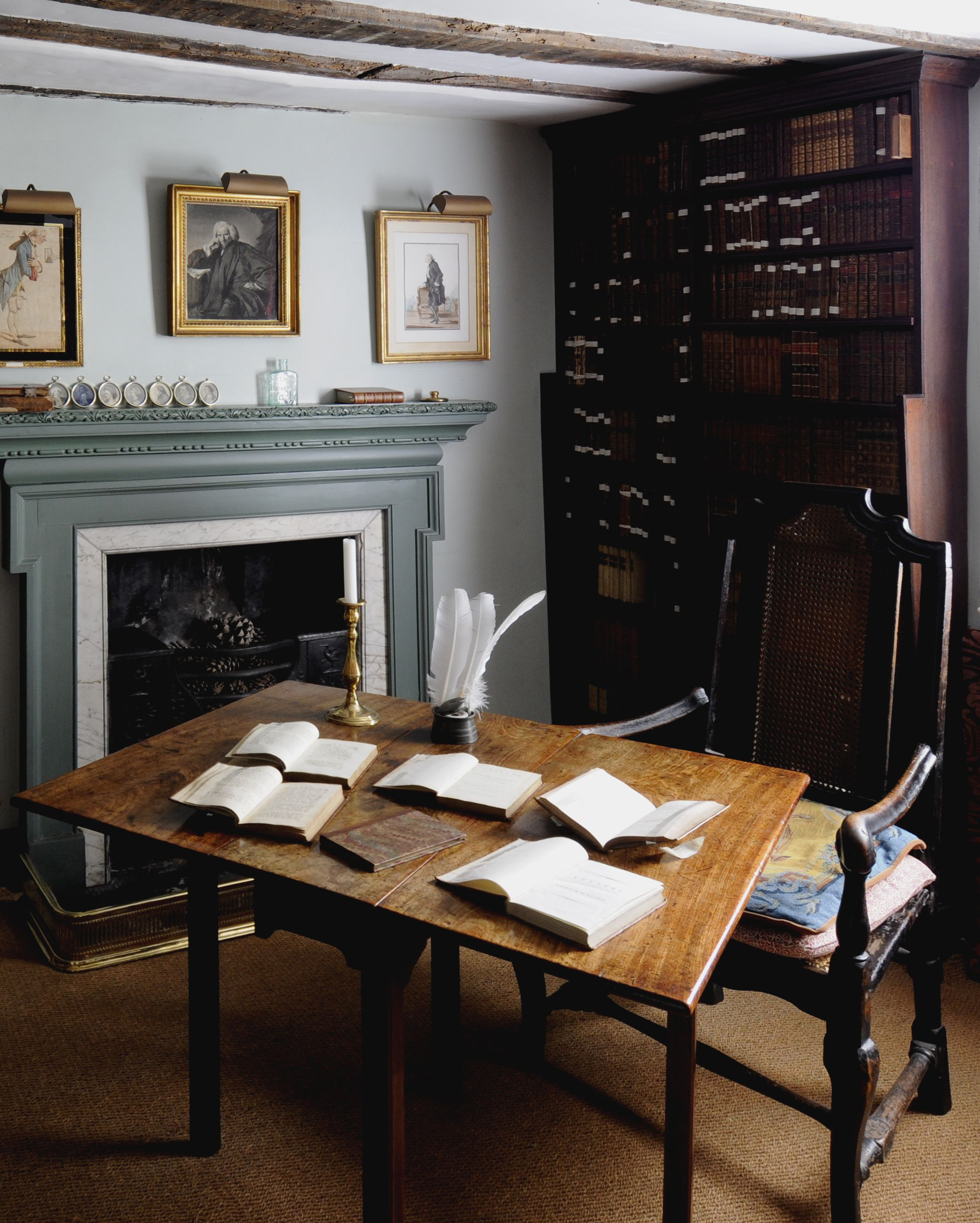
Sterne's study

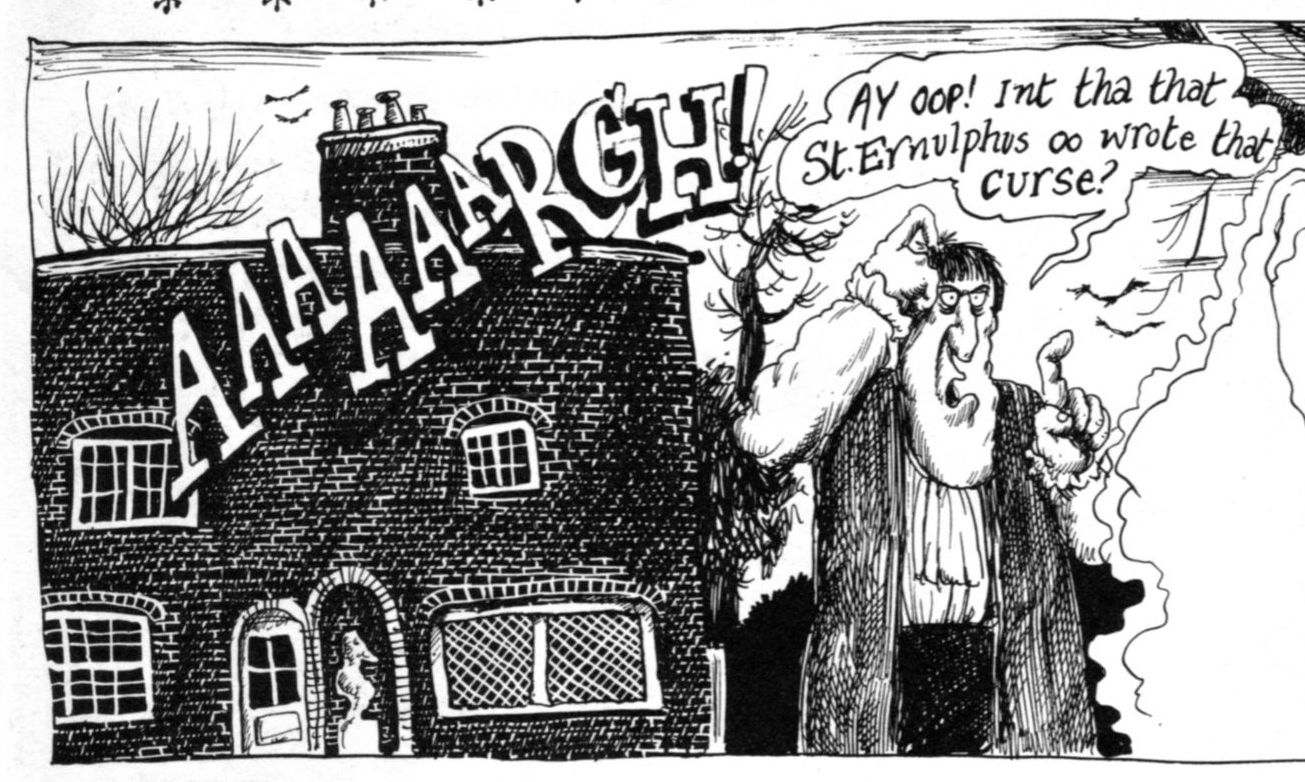
Shandy Hall appearing in a detail of Martin Rowson's graphic novel of The Life and Opinions of Tristram Shandy, Gentleman
