= St Michael's Church, Coxwold =

Church in North Yorkshire, England

Coordinates: 54°11′16″N 1°11′05″W

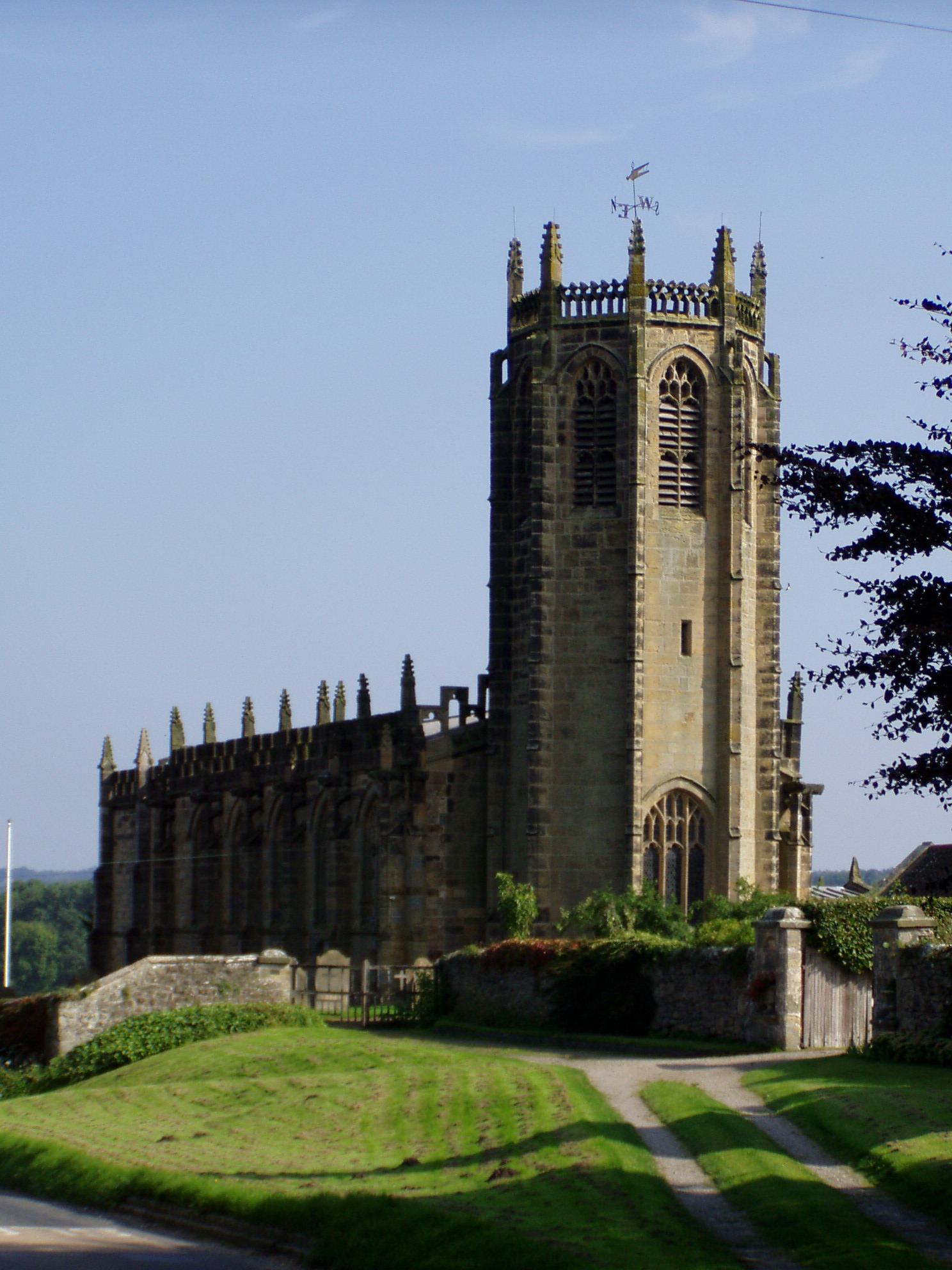
St Michael's Church, Coxwold

St Michael's Church is an Anglican parish church in Coxwold, North Yorkshire, England. The Parish of Coxwold is part of the Church of England's Diocese of York.

The earliest church on the site dates to the Anglo-Saxon period. That church was replaced by a Norman one built in the 11th century, and that in turn was replaced with the present church which was built by 1430, when the parish was still Catholic. The church is in the Perpendicular style, and among its unusual features are an octagonal tower and a tongue-shaped altar rail. The church is a grade I listed building.

The church is the resting place of Rear Admiral Lord Adolphus FitzClarence, an illegitimate son of Prince William, the future William IV, and his mistress Dorothea Jordan.

== See also ==
- Grade I listed buildings in North Yorkshire (district)
- Listed buildings in Coxwold

== Gallery ==
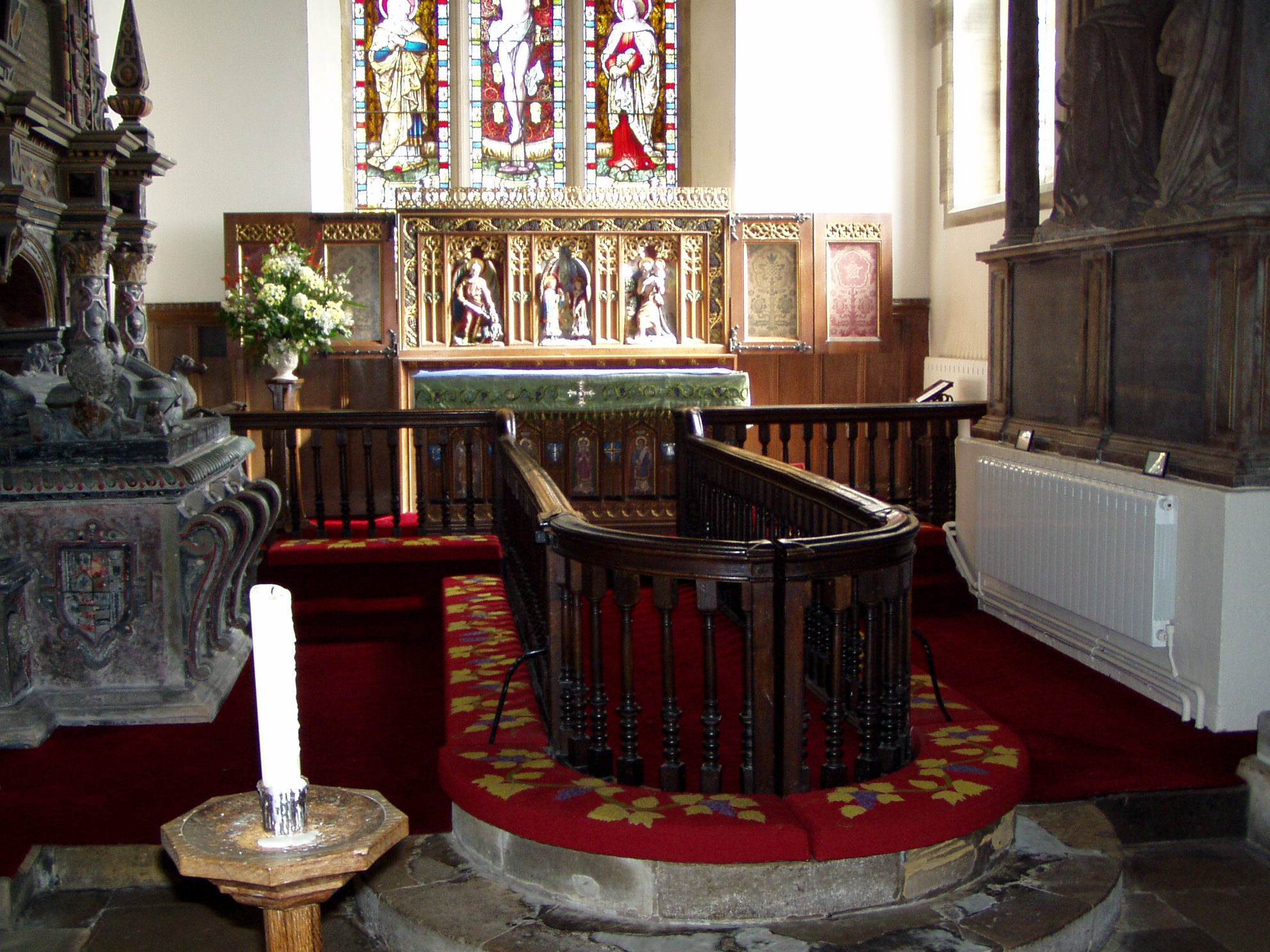
The chancel

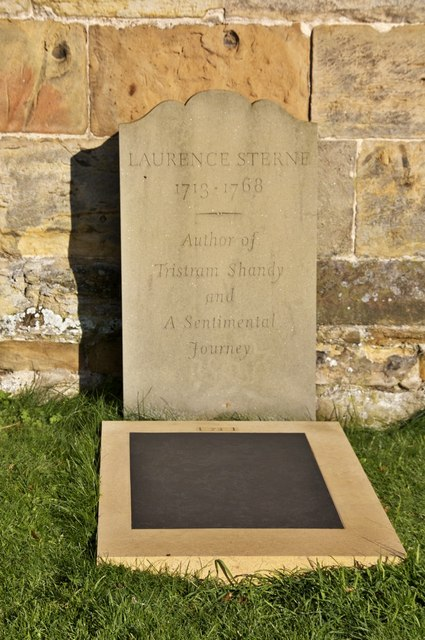
Laurence Sterne's gravestone

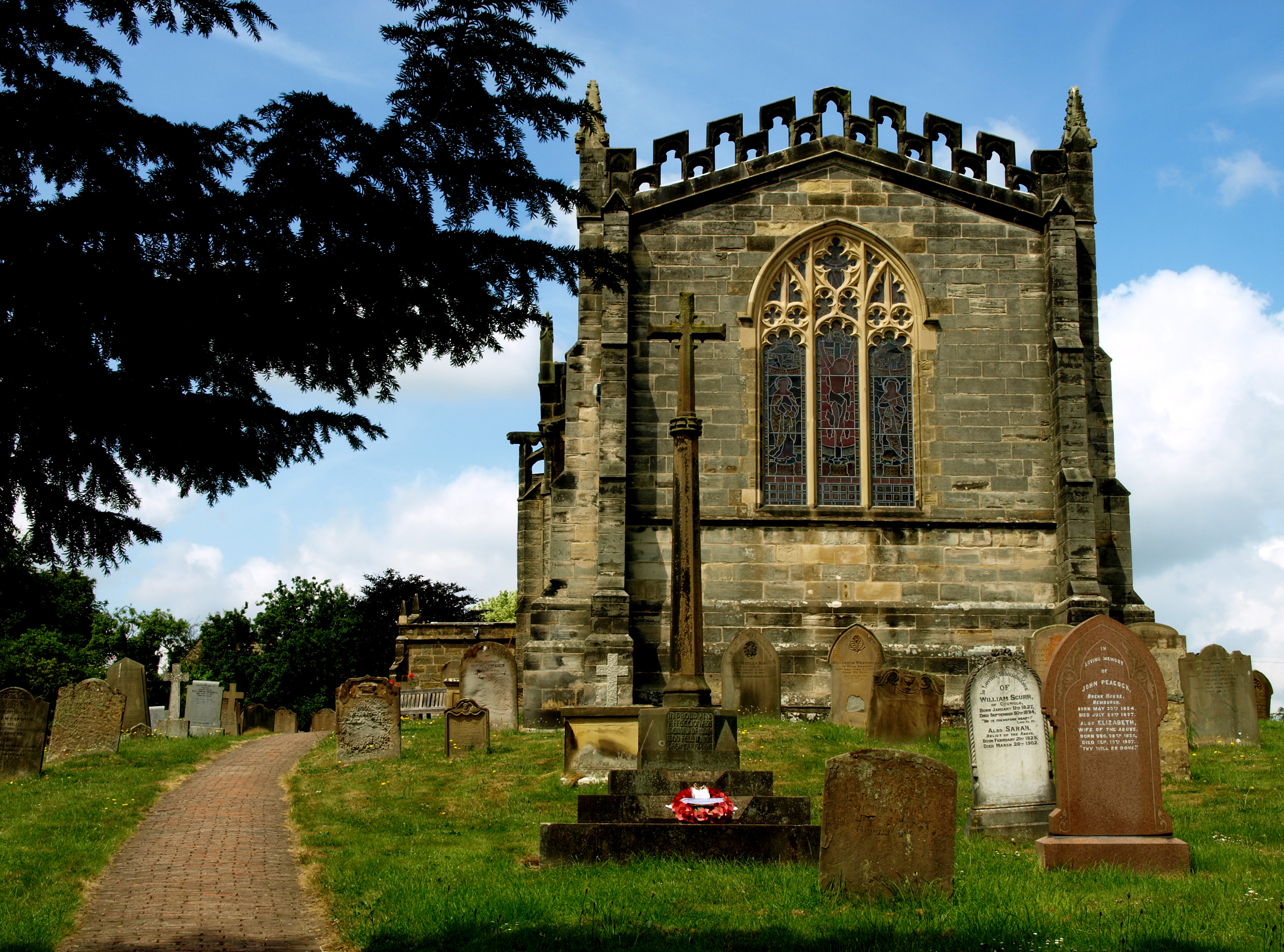
The east front and war memorial

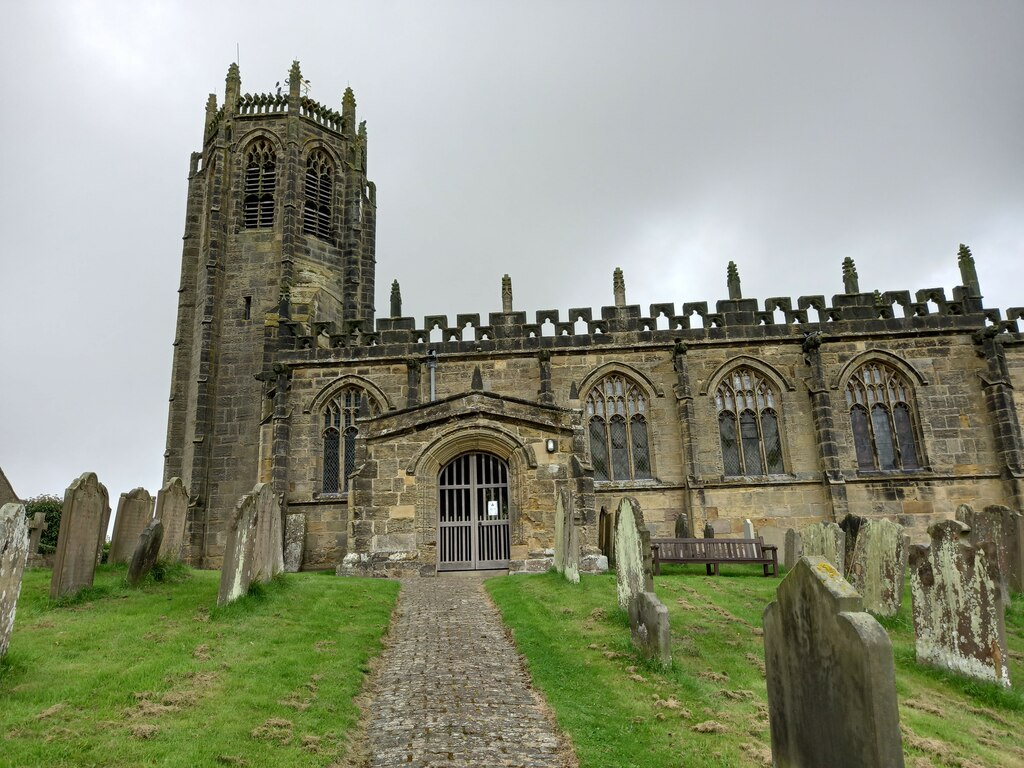
From the south
