= Wilhelm II =

German Emperor from 1888 to 1918

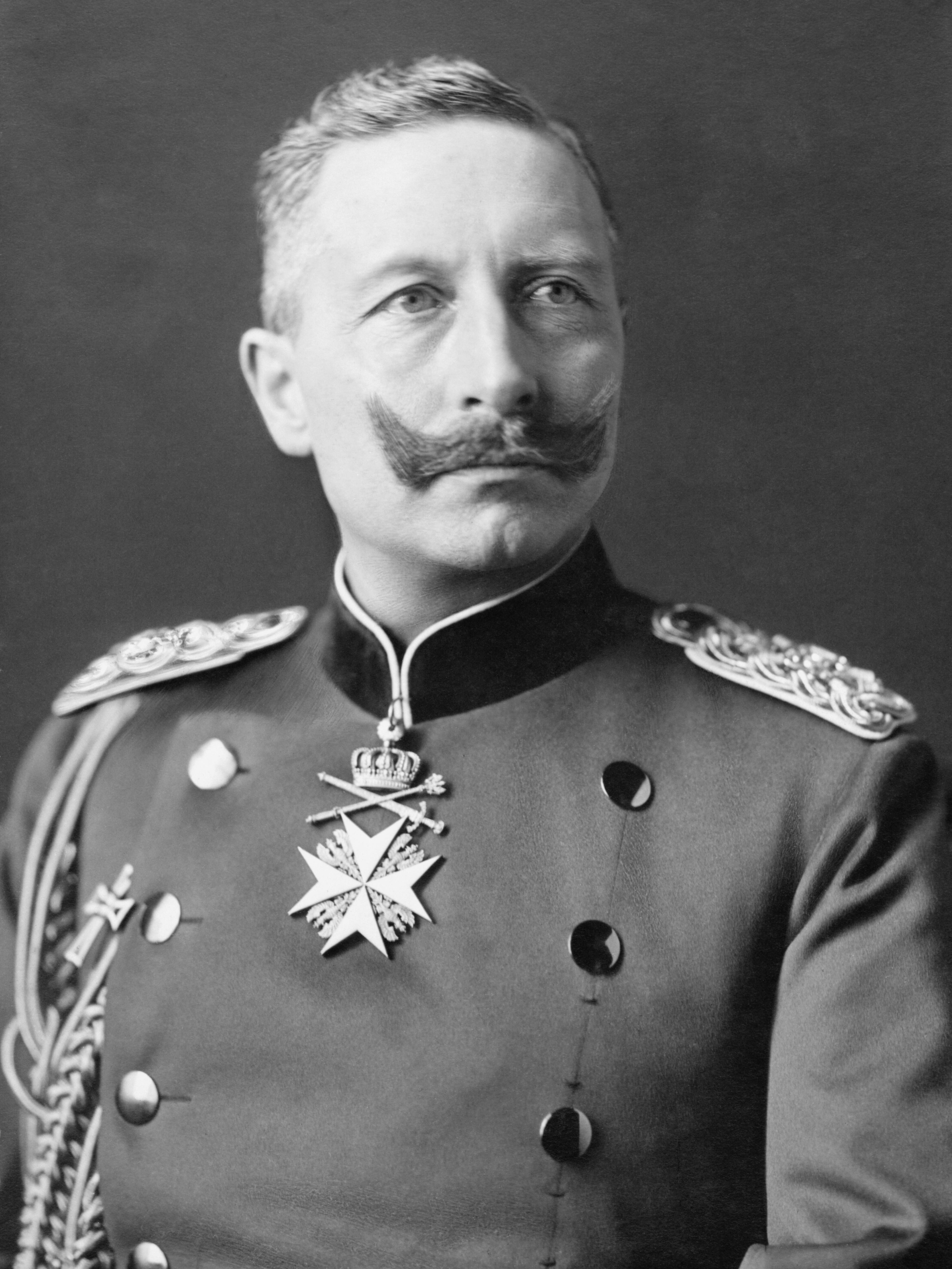
- Wilhelm in 1902

German Emperor King of Prussia
- Reign: 15 June 1888 – 9 November 1918
- Predecessor: Friedrich III
- Successor: Monarchy abolished Friedrich Ebert (as President of the Weimar Republic)
- Chancellors: See list: Otto von Bismarck; Leo von Caprivi; Chlodwig zu Hohenlohe-Schillingsfürst; Bernhard von Bülow; Theobald von Bethmann Hollweg; Georg Michaelis; Georg von Hertling; Maximilian von Baden
- Born: Prince Friedrich Wilhelm of Prussia; 27 January 1859; Kronprinzenpalais, Berlin, Prussia
- Died: 4 June 1941 (aged 82); Huis Doorn, Doorn, Reichskommissariat Niederlande
- Burial: 9 June 1941; Huis Doorn, Doorn, Netherlands
- Spouses: Augusta Viktoria of Schleswig-Holstein (m. 1881; died 1921) Hermine Reuss of Greiz (m. 1922)
- Issue: Wilhelm, German Crown Prince; Prince Eitel Friedrich; Prince Adalbert; Prince August Wilhelm; Prince Oskar; Prince Joachim; Viktoria Luise, Duchess of Brunswick
Names
- German: Friedrich Wilhelm Viktor Albert; English: Frederick William Victor Albert
- House: Hohenzollern
- Father: Friedrich III
- Mother: Victoria, Princess Royal
- Religion: Lutheran

Wilhelm II (Note: Compared with other historical monarchs, the term "William II" is not commonly used in modern English, but many older sources used this name.) (Friedrich Wilhelm Viktor Albert; 27 January 1859 – 4 June 1941) was the last German Emperor from 1888 until his abdication in 1918. His fall from power marked the end of the German Empire as well as the Hohenzollern dynasty's 400-year rule over Prussia.

Born during the reign of his granduncle Frederick William IV of Prussia, Wilhelm was the son of Prince Frederick William and Victoria, Princess Royal. Through his mother, he was the eldest of the 42 grandchildren of Queen Victoria of the United Kingdom. In March 1888, Wilhelm's father, Frederick William, ascended the German and Prussian thrones as Frederick III. Frederick died just 99 days later, and his son succeeded him as Kaiser Wilhelm II.

In March 1890, the young Kaiser dismissed longtime Chancellor Otto von Bismarck and assumed direct control over his nation's policies, embarking on a "New Course" to cement Germany's status as a leading world power. Over the course of his reign, Germany acquired new territories in China and the Pacific and became Europe's largest manufacturer. However, Wilhelm often undermined such progress by making tactless and threatening statements towards other countries without first consulting his ministers. Likewise, he and his government did much to alienate the German Empire from most of Europe by initiating a massive naval build-up, contesting French control of Morocco, backing Austria-Hungary's annexation of Bosnia and threatening Britain's access to the Persian Gulf by building a railway through Baghdad. By the second decade of the 20th century, Germany could rely only on significantly weaker nations such as Austria-Hungary and the declining Ottoman Empire as allies.

Despite strengthening Germany's position as a great power in the short term by building a powerful navy and promoting scientific innovation within its borders, Wilhelm II's erratic foreign policy greatly antagonized the international community and is considered by many to have led to the fall of the German Empire. In 1914, his diplomatic brinksmanship culminated in the guarantee of his country's military support to Austria-Hungary during the July Crisis which ultimately plunged all of Europe into World War I. A lax wartime leader, Wilhelm left virtually all decisions regarding strategy and organisation of the war effort to the German Supreme Army Command. By August 1916, his broad delegation of power gave rise to a de facto military dictatorship that dominated the country's policies in his place for the rest of the conflict. Despite emerging victorious over Russia and obtaining significant territorial gains in Eastern Europe, Germany relinquished all its conquests after its forces were decisively defeated on the Western Front in the autumn of 1918.

Losing the support of his country's military and many of his subjects, Wilhelm was forced to abdicate during the German Revolution of 1918–1919 which converted Germany into an unstable democratic state known as the Weimar Republic. The Treaty of Versailles stated he would face trial for the war. Wilhelm fled to exile in the Netherlands, where he remained during its occupation by Nazi Germany in 1940 before dying there in 1941.

== Early life ==
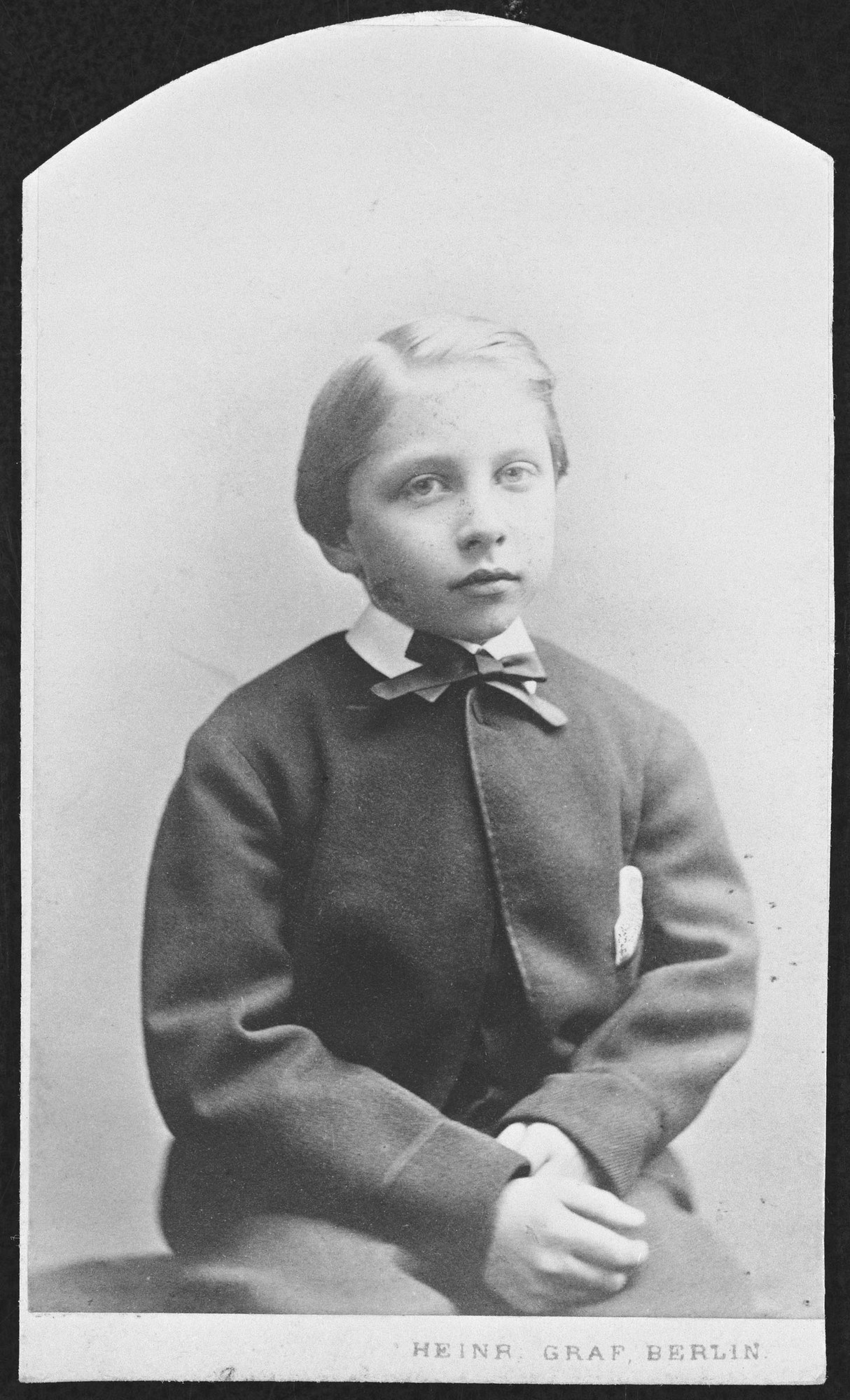
Wilhelm in 1867, aged 8

Wilhelm was born on 27 January 1859 at the Crown Prince's Palace in Berlin, Germany, to Victoria, Princess Royal ("Vicky") and Prince Frederick William of Prussia ("Fritz", the future Frederick III). His mother, Vicky, was the eldest child of Queen Victoria of the United Kingdom. At the time of Wilhelm's birth, his granduncle Frederick William IV was king of Prussia. He had been left permanently incapacitated by a series of strokes, and his younger brother Wilhelm, the young prince's grandfather, was acting as regent. Prince Wilhelm was the eldest of Queen Victoria and Prince Albert's 42 grandchildren. Upon the death of Frederick William IV in January 1861, Wilhelm's namesake grandfather became king, and the two-year-old Wilhelm became second in the line of succession to the Prussian throne. After 1871, Wilhelm was also second in the line of succession to the German imperial throne, which, under the constitution of the German Empire, was held by the Prussian king. At the time of his birth, he was also sixth in the line of succession to the British throne, after his maternal uncles and his mother.

=== Traumatic birth ===
Shortly before midnight on 26 January 1859, Princess Vicky experienced labour pains, followed by her water breaking, after which August Wegner, the family's personal physician, was summoned. After examining Vicky, Wegner determined that the infant was in the breech position. Gynaecologist Eduard Arnold Martin was then sent for, arriving at the palace at 10 am on 27 January. After administering ipecac and prescribing a mild dose of chloroform, which was administered by Vicky's personal physician Sir James Clark, Martin told Fritz that the unborn child's life was in danger. As mild anaesthesia did not alleviate her extreme labour pains, resulting in her "horrible screams and wails", Clark finally administered full anaesthesia.

Observing her contractions to be insufficiently strong, Martin administered a dose of ergot extract, and at 2:45 pm saw the infant's buttocks emerging from the birth canal but noticed the pulse in the umbilical cord was weak and intermittent. Despite this dangerous sign, Martin ordered a further heavy dose of chloroform, so he could better manipulate the infant. Observing that the infant's legs were raised, with his left arm also raised behind his head, Martin "carefully eased out the Prince's legs". Due to the "narrowness of the birth canal", he then forcibly pulled the left arm downwards, tearing the brachial plexus, then continued to grasp the left arm to rotate the infant's trunk and free the right arm, likely exacerbating the injury. After completing the delivery, Martin turned his attention to the unconscious Vicky, despite realising that the newborn prince was hypoxic. After several minutes, Martin noticed that the newborn remained silent, and he and the midwife Fräulein Stahl worked frantically to revive the prince; finally, despite the disapproval of those present, Stahl spanked the newborn vigorously until "a weak cry escaped his pale lips".

Modern medical assessments have concluded that Wilhelm's hypoxic state at birth, caused by the breech delivery and the heavy dosage of chloroform, left him with minimal to mild brain damage, which manifested itself in his subsequent hyperactive and erratic behaviour, limited attention span, and impaired social abilities. The brachial plexus injury resulted in Erb's palsy, which left Wilhelm with a withered left arm about six inches (15 centimetres) shorter than his right. He attempted to conceal this; many photographs show him holding a pair of white gloves in his left hand to make the arm seem longer. In others, he holds his left hand with his right, has his disabled arm on the hilt of a sword, or holds a cane to give the illusion of a useful limb posed at a dignified angle. Historians have suggested that this disability affected his emotional development.

=== Early years ===
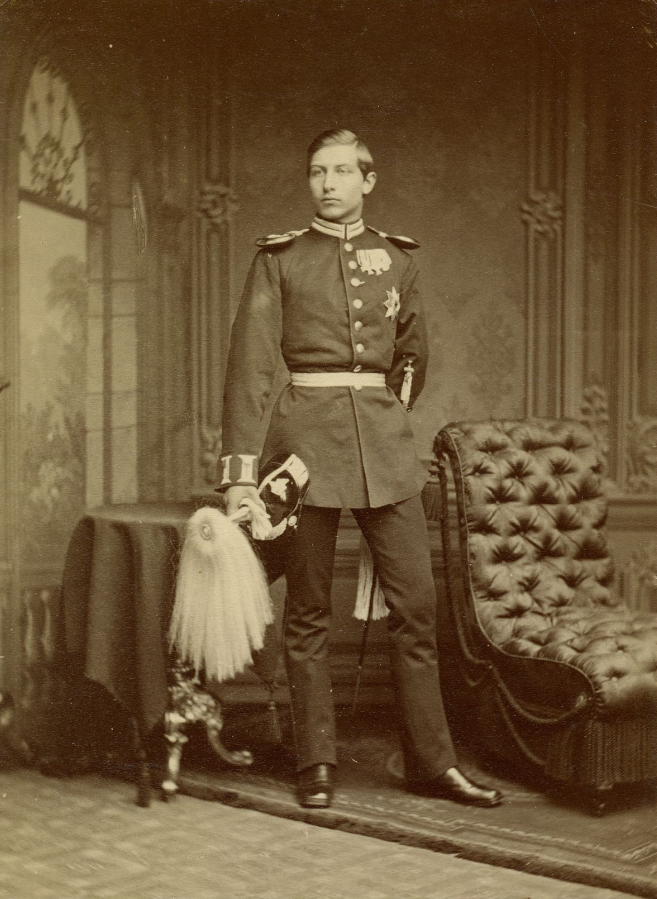
Wilhelm as a student aged 18 in Kassel.

In 1863, Wilhelm was taken to England to be present at the wedding of his uncle Bertie (the future King Edward VII and Princess Alexandra of Denmark (the future Queen Alexandra). Wilhelm attended the ceremony in a Highland costume, complete with a small toy dirk. During the ceremony, the four-year-old became restless. His 18-year-old uncle Prince Alfred, charged with keeping an eye on him, told him to be quiet, but Wilhelm drew his dirk and threatened Alfred. When Alfred attempted to subdue him by force, Wilhelm bit him on the leg. His grandmother, Queen Victoria, missed seeing the fracas; to her Wilhelm remained "a clever, dear, good little child, the great favourite of my beloved Vicky".

Vicky was obsessed with her son's damaged arm, blaming herself for the child's handicap, and insisted that he become a good rider. The thought that Wilhelm, as heir to the throne, should not be able to ride was intolerable to her. Riding lessons began when Wilhelm was eight and were a matter of endurance for him. Over and over, the weeping prince was set on his horse and compelled to go through the paces. He fell off repeatedly but, despite his tears, was placed back on the horse. After weeks of this, he was finally able to maintain his balance.

From the age of six, Wilhelm was tutored and heavily influenced by Georg Ernst Hinzpeter. "Hinzpeter", he later wrote, "was really a good fellow. Whether he was the right tutor for me, I dare not decide. The torments inflicted on me, in this pony riding, must be attributed to my mother."

As a teenager, Wilhelm was educated at Kassel at the Friedrichsgymnasium. In January 1877, Wilhelm completed his studies at the Friedrichsgymnasium and, on his 18th birthday, received the Order of the Garter from his grandmother. After Kassel, he spent four terms at the University of Bonn, studying law and politics. He became a member of the Corps Borussia Bonn. Wilhelm possessed a quick intelligence, but this was often overshadowed by a cantankerous temper.

As a scion of the royal house of Hohenzollern, Wilhelm was exposed from an early age to the military society of the Prussian aristocracy. This had a major impact on him, and in maturity Wilhelm was seldom seen out of uniform. The hyper-masculine military culture of Prussia in this period did much to frame his political ideals and personal relationships.

Wilhelm was in awe of his father, whose status as a hero of the wars of unification was largely responsible for the young Wilhelm's attitude, as were the circumstances in which he was raised; close emotional contact between father and son was not encouraged. Later, as he came into contact with the Crown Prince's political opponents, Wilhelm came to adopt more ambivalent feelings toward his father, perceiving his mother's influence over a figure who should have been possessed of masculine independence and strength. Wilhelm also idolised his grandfather, Wilhelm I, and he was instrumental in later attempts to foster a cult of the first German Emperor as "Wilhelm the Great". However, he had a distant relationship with his mother.

Wilhelm resisted attempts by his parents, especially his mother, to educate him in a spirit of British liberalism. Instead, he agreed with his tutors' support of autocratic rule, and gradually became thoroughly 'Prussianized' under their influence. He thus became alienated from his parents, suspecting them of putting Britain's interests first. The German Emperor, Wilhelm I, watched as his grandson, guided principally by the Crown Princess Victoria, grew to manhood. When Wilhelm was nearing 21, the Emperor decided it was time his grandson should begin the military phase of his preparation for the throne. He was assigned as a lieutenant to the First Regiment of Foot Guards, stationed at Potsdam. "In the Guards," Wilhelm said, "I really found my family, my friends, my interests—everything of which I had up to that time had to do without." As a boy and a student, his manner had been polite and agreeable; as an officer, he began to strut and speak brusquely in the tone he deemed appropriate for a Prussian officer.

When Wilhelm was in his early twenties, Chancellor Otto von Bismarck tried to separate him from his parents, who opposed Bismarck and his policies, with some success. Bismarck planned to use the young prince as a weapon against his parents in order to retain his own political dominance. Wilhelm thus developed a dysfunctional relationship with his parents, but especially with his English mother. In an outburst in April 1889, Wilhelm angrily implied that "an English doctor killed my father, and an English doctor crippled my arm—which is the fault of my mother", who allowed no German physicians to attend to herself or her immediate family.

As a young man, Wilhelm fell in love with one of his maternal first cousins, Princess Elisabeth of Hesse-Darmstadt. She turned him down, and in time, married into the Russian imperial family. In 1880, Wilhelm became engaged to Princess Augusta Victoria of Schleswig-Holstein, known as "Dona". The couple married on 27 February 1881 and remained married until her death in 1921. Between 1882 and 1892, Augusta gave birth to seven children, six sons and a daughter.

Beginning in 1884, Bismarck began advocating that Kaiser Wilhelm send his grandson on diplomatic missions, a privilege denied to the Crown Prince. That year, Prince Wilhelm was sent to the court of Tsar Alexander III of Russia in St. Petersburg to attend the coming-of-age ceremony of the 16-year-old Tsarevich Nicholas. Wilhelm's behaviour did little to ingratiate himself to the tsar. Two years later, Kaiser Wilhelm I took Prince Wilhelm on a trip to meet with Emperor Franz Joseph I of Austria-Hungary. In 1886, through Herbert von Bismarck, the Chancellor's son, Prince Wilhelm began training twice a week at the Foreign Ministry.

== Accession ==
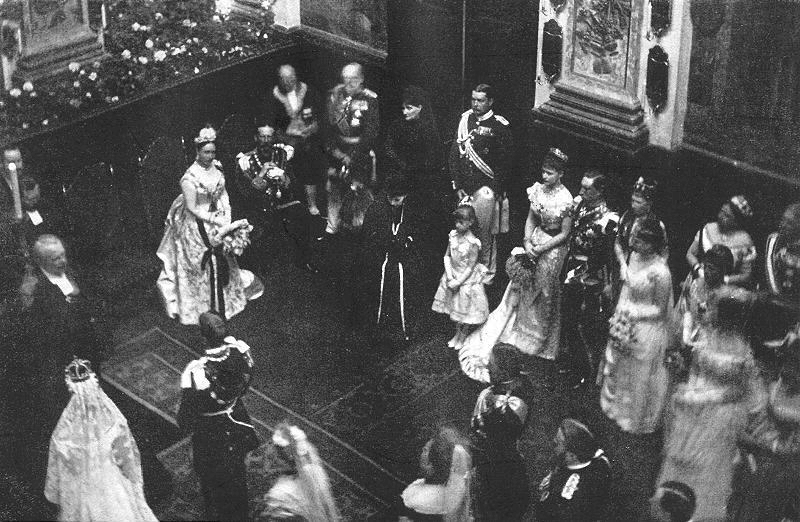
Wedding of Prince Henry of Prussia with Princess Irene of Hesse on 24 May 1888. The future emperor Wilhelm II is on the right. The emperor Frederick III is seated on the left and would have died just three weeks after.

Kaiser Wilhelm I died in Berlin on 9 March 1888, and Prince Wilhelm's father ascended the throne as Frederick III. He was already experiencing an incurable throat cancer and spent all 99 days of his reign fighting the disease before dying. On 15 June of that same year, his 29-year-old son succeeded him as German Emperor and King of Prussia.

Although in his youth he had been a great admirer of Otto von Bismarck, Wilhelm's characteristic impatience soon brought him into conflict with the "Iron Chancellor", the dominant figure in the foundation of his empire. The new Emperor opposed Bismarck's careful foreign policy, preferring vigorous and rapid expansion to protect Germany's "place in the sun". Furthermore, the young Emperor had come to the throne, unlike his grandfather, determined to rule as well as reign. While the imperial constitution vested executive power in the monarch, Wilhelm I had been content to leave day-to-day administration to Bismarck. Early conflicts between Wilhelm II and his chancellor soon poisoned the relationship between the two men. Bismarck had believed that Wilhelm was a lightweight who could be dominated, and he showed escalating disrespect for Wilhelm's favored policy objectives in the late 1880s. The final split between monarch and statesman occurred soon after an attempt by Bismarck to implement far-reaching anti-Socialist laws in early 1890.

== Dismissal of Bismarck ==
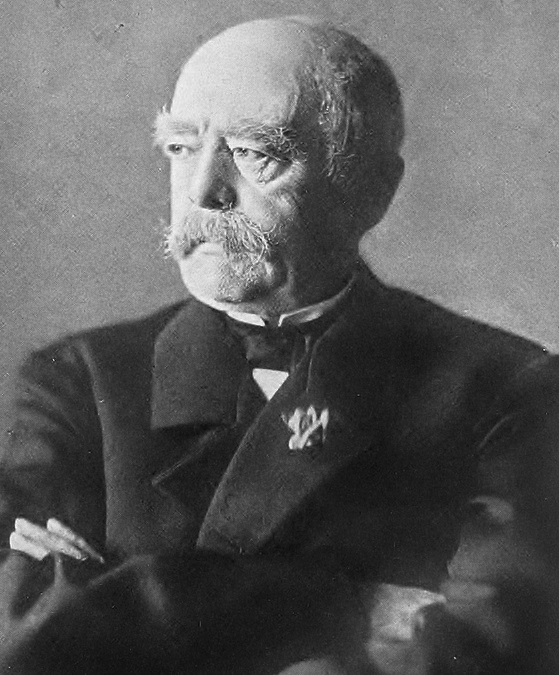
Otto von Bismarck, the Chancellor who effectively dictated German policy until Wilhelm II assumed the throne in 1888

According to adherents of the "Bismarck myth", the young Kaiser rejected the Iron Chancellor's allegedly "peaceful foreign policy" and instead plotted with senior generals to work "in favour of a war of aggression". Bismarck himself once complained to an aide, "That young man wants war with Russia, and would like to draw his sword straight away if he could. I shall not be a party to it."

But the origin of Bismarck's dismissal lay in home affairs. After gaining an absolute majority in the Reichstag he formed the Kartell, a coalition government of the German Conservative Party and the National Liberal Party. They favoured making the anti-Socialist laws permanent, with one exception: giving the German police the power, similarly to the Tsarist Okhrana, to expel alleged Socialist agitators from their homes by decree and into internal exile. Even Old Liberal statesman Eugen Richter, the author of the famous 1891 dystopian novel Pictures of the Socialistic Future, opposed banning the Social Democratic Party outright and said: "I fear Social Democracy more under this law than without it". The Kartell split over this issue and the law was not passed.

As the debate continued, Wilhelm became more and more interested in the social problems being exploited in the propaganda of the Socialists, especially the treatment of mine workers who went on strike in 1889. He routinely disagreed with Bismarck during Cabinet meetings. Bismarck, in turn, sharply disagreed with Wilhelm's pro-labor union policies and worked to circumvent them. Bismarck, feeling unappreciated by the young Emperor and by his ambitious advisors, once refused to co-sign a proclamation regarding the protection of industrial workers, as was required by the German Constitution, and prevented it from being made law. While Bismarck had previously sponsored landmark social security legislation, by 1889–90, he had become violently opposed to the rise of organized labor. In particular, he was opposed to wage increases, improving working conditions, and regulating labour relations.

The final break between the Iron Chancellor and the Kaiser came when Bismarck initiated discussions with the opposition to form a new parliamentary majority without consulting with Wilhelm first. The Kartell, the shifting coalition government that Bismarck had been able to maintain since 1867, had finally lost its majority of seats in the Reichstag due to the Anti-Socialist Laws fiasco. The remaining powers in the Reichstag were the Catholic Centre Party and the Conservative Party.

In most parliamentary systems, the head of government depends upon the confidence of the parliamentary majority and has the right to form coalitions to maintain a majority of supporters. In a constitutional monarchy, however, the Chancellor is required to meet regularly with the monarch to explain their policies and intentions within the Government. A Chancellor in a constitutional monarchy also cannot afford to make an enemy of the monarch, who represents the only real check and balance against a Chancellor's otherwise absolute power. This is because a constitutional monarch has plenty of means at their disposal of quietly blocking a Chancellor's policy objectives and is one of the only people who can forcibly remove an overly ambitious Chancellor from power. For these reasons, the last Kaiser believed that he had every right to be informed before Bismarck began coalition talks with the Opposition.

In a deeply ironic moment, a mere decade after demonizing all members of the Catholic Church in Germany as (German: Reichsfeinde, "traitors to the Empire") during the Kulturkampf, Bismarck decided to start coalition talks with the all-Catholic Centre Party. He invited that party's leader in the Reichstag, Baron Ludwig von Windthorst, to meet with him and begin the negotiations. The Kaiser, who had always had a warm relationship with Baron von Windthorst, whose decades long defence of German Catholics, Poles, Jews, and other minorities against the Iron Chancellor have since attracted comparisons to Irish nationalist statesmen Daniel O'Connell and Charles Stewart Parnell, was furious to hear about Bismarck's plans for coalition talks with the Centre Party only after they had already begun.

After a heated argument at Bismarck's estate over the latter's alleged disrespect for the Imperial Family, Wilhelm stormed out. Bismarck, forced for the first time in his career into a crisis that he could not twist to his own advantage, wrote a blistering letter of resignation, decrying the Monarchy's involvement in both foreign and domestic policy. The letter was published only after Bismarck's death.

In later years, Bismarck created the "Bismarck myth"; the view (which some historians have argued was confirmed by subsequent events) that Wilhelm II's successful demand for Bismarck's resignation destroyed any chance Imperial Germany ever had of stable government and international peace. According to this view, what Wilhelm termed "The New Course" is characterised as Germany's ship of state going dangerously off course, leading directly to the carnage of the First and Second World Wars.

According to Bismarck apologists, in foreign policy the Iron Chancellor had achieved a fragile balance of interests between Germany, France and Russia. Peace was allegedly at hand and Bismarck tried to keep it that way despite growing popular sentiment against Britain (regarding the German colonial empire) and especially against Russia. With Bismarck's dismissal, the Russians allegedly expected a reversal of policy in Berlin, so they quickly negotiated a military alliance with the Third French Republic, beginning a process that by 1914 largely isolated Germany.

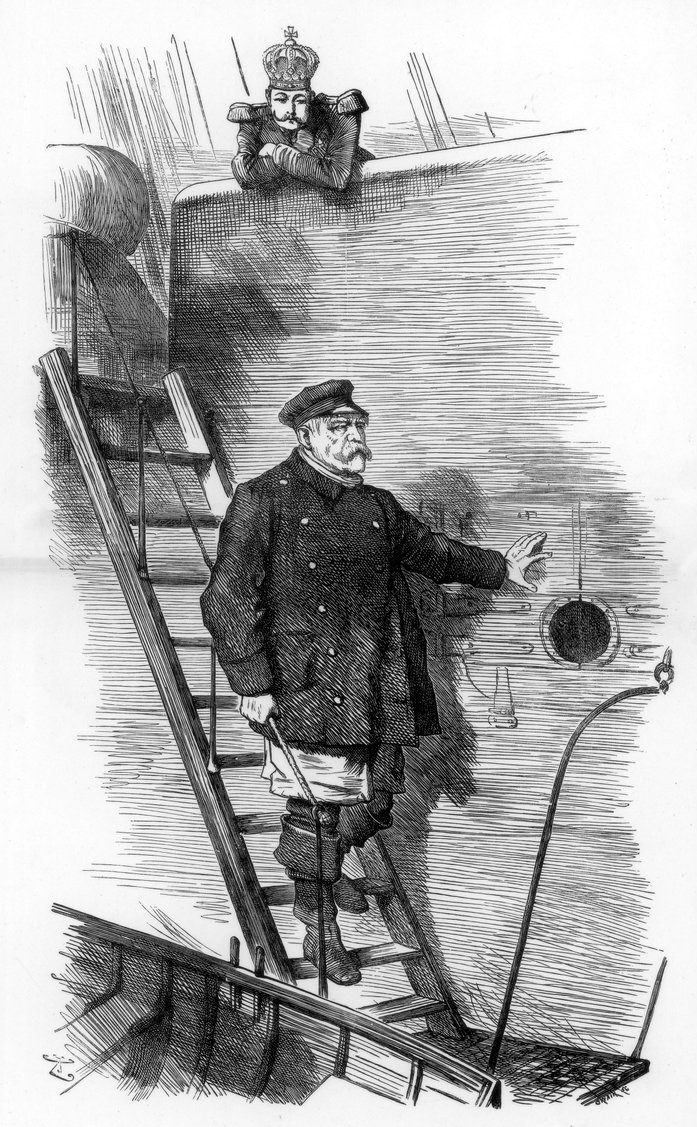
"Dropping the Pilot" by John Tenniel, published in Punch on 29 March 1890, two weeks after Bismarck's forced resignation as Chancellor

In contrast, historian Modris Eksteins has argued that Bismarck's dismissal was actually long overdue. According to Eksteins, the Iron Chancellor, in his need for a scapegoat, had demonized Classical Liberals in the 1860s, Roman Catholics in the 1870s, and Socialists in the 1880s with the highly successful and often repeated refrain, "The Reich is in danger." Therefore, in order to divide and rule, Bismarck ultimately left the German people even more divided in 1890 than they had ever been before 1871.

In interviews with C.L. Sulzberger for the book The Fall of Eagles, Prince Louis Ferdinand of Prussia, grandson and heir of Kaiser Wilhelm II, further commented, "Bismarck was certainly our greatest statesman, but he had very bad manners and he became increasingly overbearing with age. Frankly, I don't think his dismissal by my grandfather was a great tragedy. Russia was already on the other side because of the Berlin Congress of 1878. Had Bismarck stayed he would not have helped. He already wanted to abolish all the reforms that had been introduced. He was aspiring to establish a kind of Shogunate and hoped to treat our family in the same way the Japanese shoguns treated the Japanese emperors isolated in Kyoto. My grandfather had no choice but to dismiss him."

== Wilhelm in control ==
=== The New Course ===
Bismarck was succeeded as Chancellor of Germany and Minister-President of Prussia by Leo von Caprivi. At the opening of the Reichstag on 6 May 1890, the Kaiser stated that the most pressing issue was the further enlargement of the bill concerning the protection of the labourer. In 1891, the Reichstag passed the Workers Protection Acts, which improved working conditions, protected women and children and regulated labour relations.

Caprivi in turn was replaced by Chlodwig von Hohenlohe-Schillingsfürst in 1894. Following the dismissal of Hohenlohe in 1900, Wilhelm appointed the man whom he regarded as "his own Bismarck", Bernhard von Bülow.

In appointing Caprivi and then Hohenlohe, Wilhelm was embarking upon what is known to history as "the New Course", in which he hoped to exert decisive influence in the government of the empire. There is debate amongst historians as to the precise degree to which Wilhelm succeeded in implementing "personal rule" in this era, but what is clear is the very different dynamic which existed between the Crown and its chief political servant (the Chancellor) in the "Wilhelmine Era". These chancellors were senior civil servants and not seasoned politician-statesmen like Bismarck. Wilhelm wanted to preclude the emergence of another Iron Chancellor, whom he ultimately detested as being "a boorish old killjoy" who had not permitted any minister to see the Emperor except in his presence, keeping a stranglehold on effective political power. Upon his enforced retirement and until his dying day, Bismarck became a bitter critic of Wilhelm's policies, but without gaining the support of a majority within the Reichstag there was little chance of Bismarck exerting a decisive influence on policy.

In the early twentieth century, Wilhelm began to concentrate upon his real agenda: the creation of a German Navy that would rival that of Britain and enable Germany to declare itself a world power. The last Kaiser ordered the high command of the armed forces to read United States Navy Admiral Alfred Thayer Mahan's book, The Influence of Sea Power upon History, and spent hours drawing sketches of the ships that he dreamed of having built. Bülow and Bethmann Hollweg, his loyal chancellors, looked after domestic affairs, while Wilhelm obliviously began to spread alarm in the chancelleries of Europe with his increasingly eccentric and ill-advised statements on foreign affairs.

=== Promoter of arts and sciences ===
Wilhelm enthusiastically promoted the arts and sciences, as well as public education and social welfare. He sponsored the Kaiser Wilhelm Society for the promotion of scientific research; it was funded by wealthy private donors and by the state and comprised a number of research institutes in both pure and applied sciences. The Prussian Academy of Sciences was unable to avoid the Kaiser's pressure and lost some of its autonomy when it was forced to incorporate new programs in engineering, and award new fellowships in engineering sciences as a result of a gift from the Kaiser in 1900.

Wilhelm supported the modernisers as they tried to reform the Prussian system of secondary education, which was rigidly traditional, elitist, politically authoritarian, and unchanged by the progress in the natural sciences. As hereditary Protector of the Order of Saint John, he offered encouragement to the Christian order's attempts to place German medicine at the forefront of modern medical practice through its system of hospitals, nursing sisterhood and nursing schools, and nursing homes throughout the German Empire. Wilhelm continued as Protector of the Order even after 1918, as the position was in essence attached to the head of the House of Hohenzollern.

== Personality ==
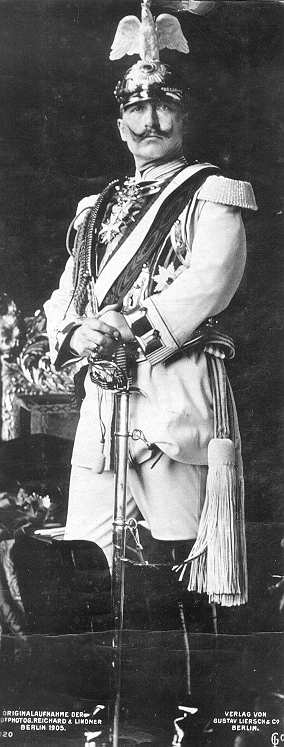
Wilhelm indulging in his famed appreciation of flamboyant uniforms

Historians have frequently stressed the role of Wilhelm's personality in shaping his reign. Thus, Thomas Nipperdey concludes he was:

...gifted, with a quick understanding, sometimes brilliant, with a taste for the modern,—technology, industry, science—but at the same time superficial, hasty, restless, unable to relax, without any deeper level of seriousness, without any desire for hard work or drive to see things through to the end, without any sense of sobriety, for balance and boundaries, or even for reality and real problems, uncontrollable and scarcely capable of learning from experience, desperate for applause and success,—as Bismarck said early on in his life, he wanted every day to be his birthday—romantic, sentimental and theatrical, unsure and arrogant, with an immeasurably exaggerated self-confidence and desire to show off, a juvenile cadet, who never took the tone of the officers' mess out of his voice, and brashly wanted to play the part of the supreme warlord, full of panicky fear of a monotonous life without any diversions, and yet aimless, pathological in his hatred against his English mother.

Historian David Fromkin states that Wilhelm had a love–hate relationship with Britain. According to Fromkin, "From the outset, the half-German side of him was at war with the half-English side. He was wildly jealous of the British, desiring to be British and to be better at being British than the British were, while at the same time hating them and resenting them because he never could be fully accepted by them".

Langer et al. (1968) emphasise the negative international consequences of Wilhelm's erratic personality: "He believed in force, and the 'survival of the fittest' in domestic as well as foreign politics ... William was not lacking in intelligence, but he did lack stability, disguising his deep insecurities by swagger and tough talk. He frequently fell into depressions and hysterics ... William's personal instability was reflected in vacillations of policy. His actions, at home as well as abroad, lacked guidance, and therefore often bewildered or infuriated public opinion. He was not so much concerned with gaining specific objectives, as had been the case with Bismarck, as with asserting his will. This trait in the ruler of the leading Continental power was one of the main causes of the uneasiness prevailing in Europe at the turn-of-the-century".

=== Relationships with foreign relatives ===
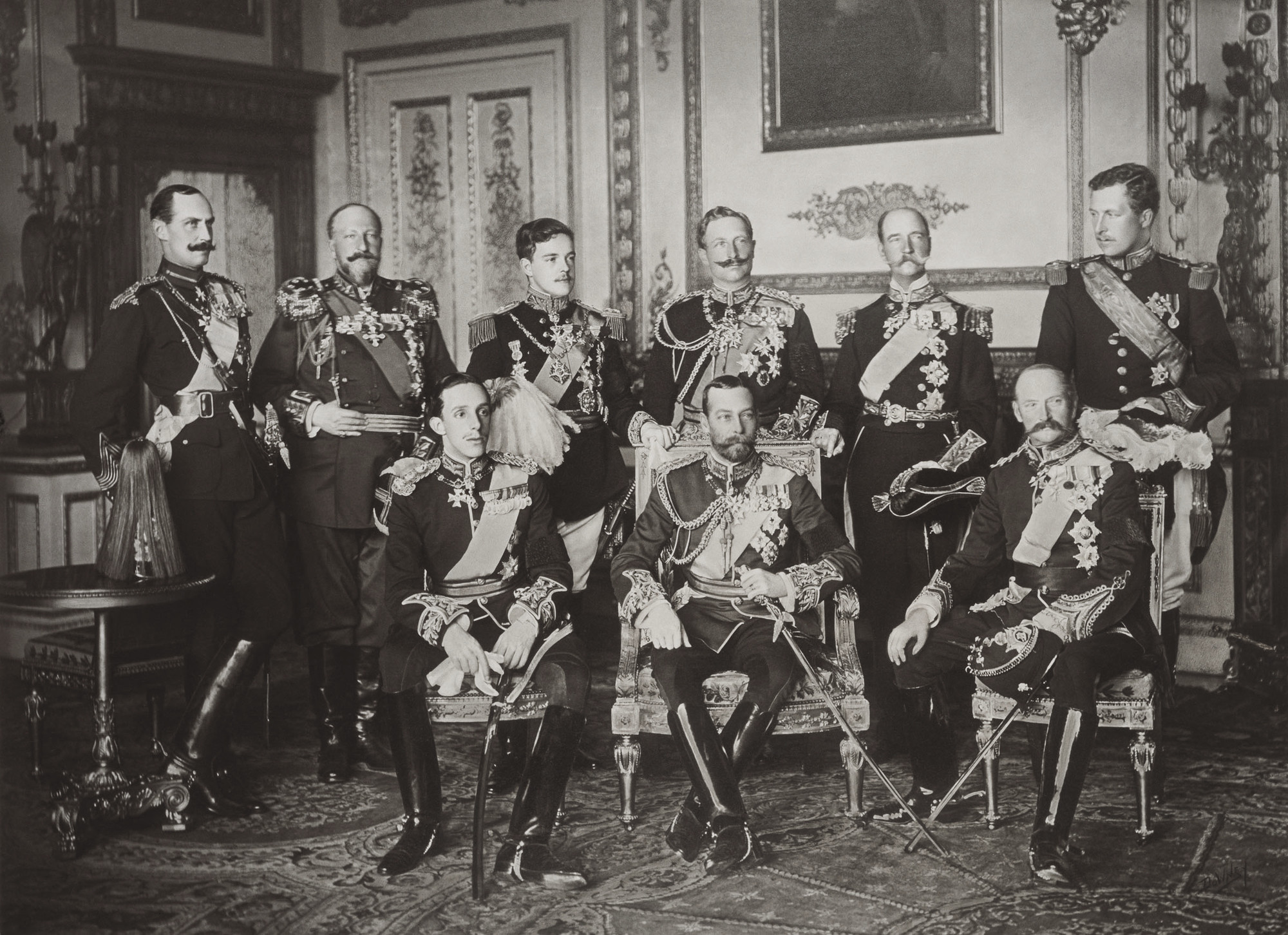
The Nine Sovereigns at Windsor for the funeral of King Edward VII, photographed on 20 May 1910. Standing, from left to right: King Haakon VII of Norway, Tsar Ferdinand I of Bulgaria, King Manuel II of Portugal, Kaiser Wilhelm II of Germany, kings George I of Greece and Albert I of Belgium. Seated, from left to right: kings Alfonso XIII of Spain, George V of the United Kingdom and Frederick VIII of Denmark.

As a grandchild of Queen Victoria, Wilhelm was a first cousin of King George V of the United Kingdom, as well as of queens Marie of Romania, Maud of Norway, Victoria Eugenie of Spain and Empress Alexandra of Russia. In 1889, Wilhelm's younger sister Sophia married Constantine, Crown Prince of Greece. Wilhelm was infuriated by his sister's conversion from Lutheranism to Greek Orthodoxy; upon her marriage, he attempted to ban her from entering Germany.

Wilhelm's most contentious relationships were with his British relations. He craved the acceptance of his grandmother, Queen Victoria, and of the rest of her family. Despite the fact that his grandmother treated him with courtesy and tact, his other relatives largely denied him acceptance. He had an especially bad relationship with his uncle Bertie (later Edward VII). Between 1888 and 1901, Wilhelm resented Bertie, who despite being the heir apparent to the British throne, treated Wilhelm not as a reigning monarch, but merely as another nephew. In turn, Wilhelm often snubbed his uncle, whom he referred to as "the old peacock" and lorded his position as emperor over him. Beginning in the 1890s, Wilhelm made visits to England for Cowes Week on the Isle of Wight and often competed against his uncle in the yacht races. Bertie's wife, Alexandra, also disliked Wilhelm. Even though Wilhelm had not been on the throne at the time, Alexandra felt anger over the Prussian seizure of Schleswig-Holstein from her native Denmark in the 1860s, and was also annoyed over Wilhelm's treatment of his mother. Despite his poor relations with his English relatives, when he received news that Queen Victoria was dying at Osborne House in January 1901, Wilhelm travelled to England and was at her bedside when she died, and he remained for the funeral. He also was present at the funeral of King Edward VII in 1910.

In 1913, Wilhelm hosted a lavish wedding in Berlin for his only daughter, Victoria Louise. Among the guests at the wedding were his cousins Tsar Nicholas II of Russia and King George V of the United Kingdom, and George's wife, Queen Mary.

== Foreign affairs ==
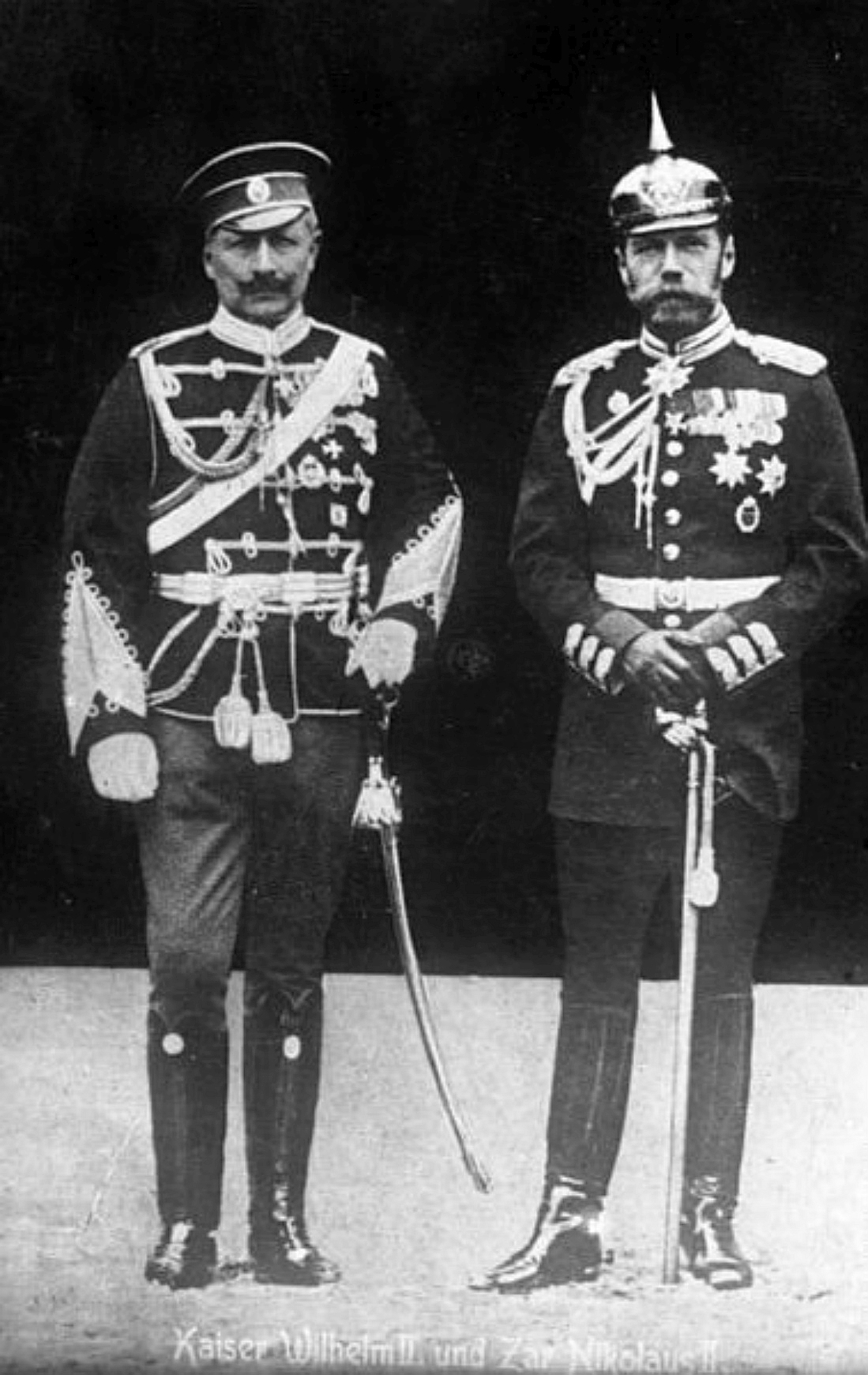
Wilhelm with Nicholas II of Russia in 1905, wearing the military uniforms of each other's army

German foreign policy under Wilhelm II was faced with a number of significant problems. Perhaps the most apparent was that Wilhelm was an impatient man, subjective in his reactions and affected strongly by sentiment and impulse. He was personally ill-equipped to steer German foreign policy along a rational course. There were a number of examples, such as the Kruger telegram of 1896 in which Wilhelm congratulated President Paul Kruger for preventing the Transvaal Republic from being annexed by the British Empire during the Jameson Raid.

British public opinion had been quite favourable towards the Kaiser in his first twelve years on the throne, but it turned sour in the late 1890s. During the First World War, he became the central target of British anti-German propaganda and the personification of a hated enemy.

Wilhelm exploited fears of a yellow peril trying to interest other European rulers in the perils they faced by invading China; few other leaders paid attention. Wilhelm also used the Japanese victory in the Russo-Japanese War to try to incite fear in the west of the yellow peril that they faced by a resurgent Imperial Japan, which Wilhelm claimed would ally with China to overrun the conventional European Powers. Wilhelm also invested in strengthening the German colonial empire in Africa and the Pacific, but few became profitable and all were lost during the First World War. In South West Africa (now Namibia), a native revolt against German rule led to the Herero and Nama genocide, although Wilhelm eventually ordered it to be stopped and recalled its mastermind General Lothar von Trotha.

One of the few times when Wilhelm succeeded in personal diplomacy was when in 1900, he supported the morganatic marriage of Archduke Franz Ferdinand of Austria to Countess Sophie Chotek, and helped negotiate an end to the opposition to the wedding by Emperor Franz Joseph I of Austria.

A domestic triumph for Wilhelm was when his daughter Victoria Louise married the Duke of Brunswick in 1913; this helped heal the rift between the House of Hanover and the House of Hohenzollern that had followed Bismarck's invasion and annexation of the Kingdom of Hanover in 1866.

=== Political visits to the Ottoman Empire ===
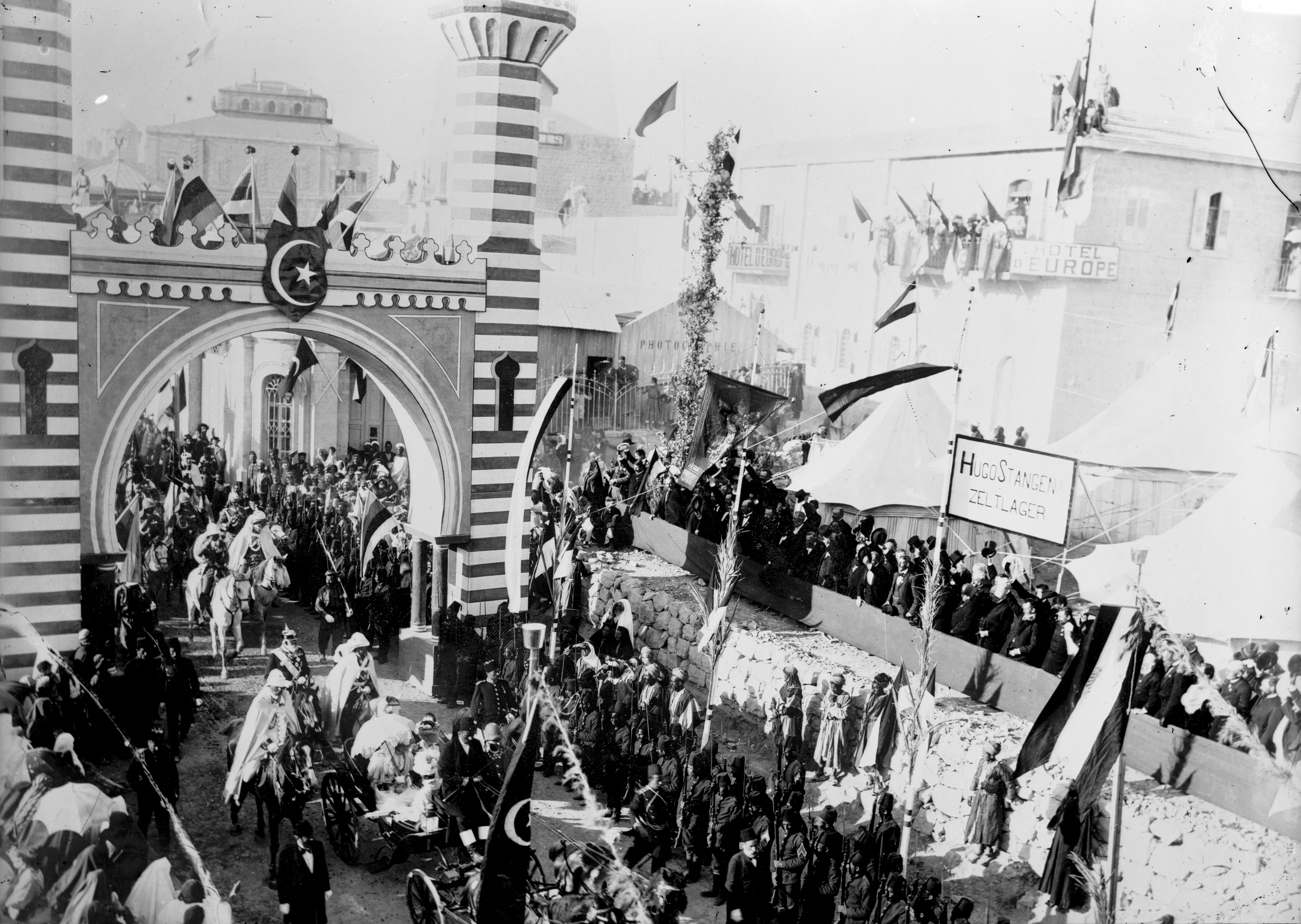
Wilhelm in Jerusalem during his state visit to the Ottoman Empire, 1898

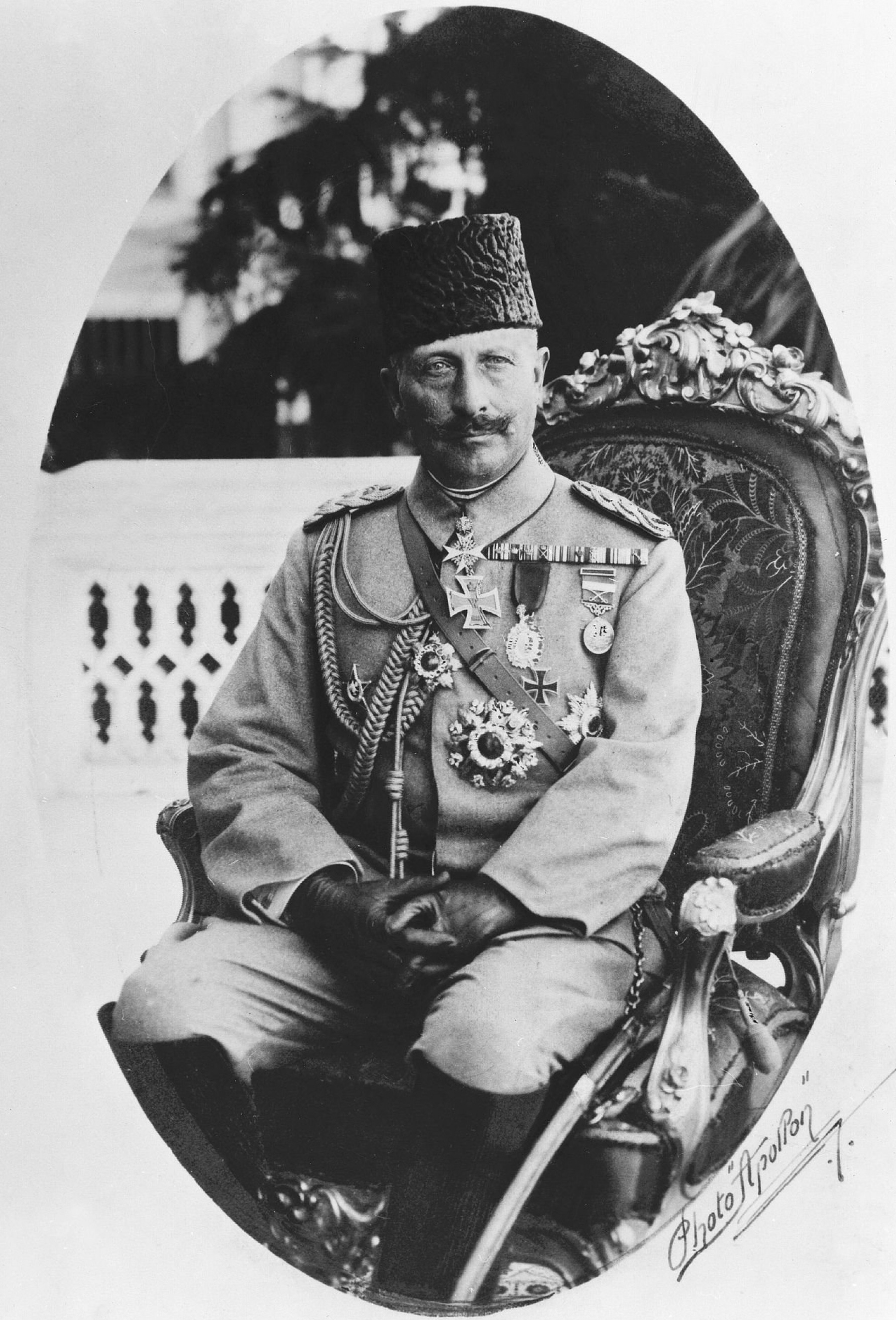
Wilhelm in Turkish field marshal uniform at Dolmabahçe Palace (15 October 1917)

In his first visit to Constantinople in 1889, Wilhelm secured the sale of German-made rifles to the Ottoman Army. Later on, he had his second political visit to the Ottoman Empire as a guest of Sultan Abdul Hamid II. The Kaiser started his journey with a visit to Constantinople on 16 October 1898; then he went by yacht to Haifa on 25 October. After visiting Jerusalem and Bethlehem, the Kaiser went back to Jaffa to embark to Beirut, where he took the train passing Aley and Zahlé to reach Damascus on 7 November. While visiting the Mausoleum of Saladin the following day, the Kaiser made a speech:

In the face of all the courtesies extended to us here, I feel that I must thank you, in my name as well as that of the Empress, for them, for the hearty reception given us in all the towns and cities we have touched, and particularly for the splendid welcome extended to us by this city of Damascus. Deeply moved by this imposing spectacle, and likewise by the consciousness of standing on the spot where held sway one of the most chivalrous rulers of all times, the great Sultan Saladin, a knight sans peur et sans reproche, who often taught his adversaries the right conception of knighthood, I seize with joy the opportunity to render thanks, above all to the Sultan Abdul Hamid for his hospitality. May the Sultan rest assured, and also the three hundred million Mohammedans scattered over the globe and revering in him their caliph, that the German Emperor will be and remain at all times their friend.

— Kaiser Wilhelm II,

On 10 November, Wilhelm went to visit Baalbek before heading to Beirut to board his ship back home on 12 November.

In his second visit, Wilhelm secured a promise for German companies to construct the Berlin–Baghdad railway, and had the German Fountain constructed in Constantinople to commemorate his journey.

His third visit was on 15–16 October 1917, as the guest of Sultan Mehmed V Reşâd and Enver Pasha.

=== Hun speech of 1900 ===
The Boxer Rebellion, an anti-foreign uprising in China, was put down in 1900 by an international force known as the Eight-Nation Alliance. The Kaiser's farewell address to departing German soldiers commanded them, in the spirit of the Huns, to be merciless in battle. Wilhelm's fiery rhetoric clearly expressed his vision for Germany as one of the great powers. There were two versions of the speech. The German Foreign Office issued an edited version, making sure to omit one particularly incendiary paragraph that they regarded as diplomatically embarrassing. The edited version was this:

Great overseas tasks have fallen to the new German Empire, tasks far greater than many of my countrymen expected. The German Empire has, by its very character, the obligation to assist its citizens if they are being set upon in foreign lands. ... A great task awaits you [in China]: you are to revenge the grievous injustice that has been done. The Chinese have overturned the law of nations; they have mocked the sacredness of the envoy, the duties of hospitality in a way unheard of in world history. It is all the more outrageous that this crime has been committed by a nation that takes pride in its ancient culture. Show the old Prussian virtue. Present yourselves as Christians in the cheerful endurance of suffering. May honor and glory follow your banners and arms. Give the whole world an example of manliness and discipline. You know full well that you are to fight against a cunning, brave, well-armed, and cruel enemy. When you encounter him, know this: no quarter will be given. Prisoners will not be taken. Exercise your arms such that for a thousand years no Chinese will dare to look cross-eyed at a German. Maintain discipline. May God's blessing be with you, the prayers of an entire nation and my good wishes go with you, each and every one. Open the way to civilization once and for all! Now you may depart! Farewell, comrades!

The official version omitted the following passage from which the speech derives its name:

Should you encounter the enemy, he will be defeated! No quarter will be given! Prisoners will not be taken! Whoever falls into your hands is forfeited. Just as a thousand years ago the Huns under their King Attila made a name for themselves, one that even today makes them seem mighty in history and legend, may the name German be affirmed by you in such a way in China that no Chinese will ever again dare to look cross-eyed at a German.

The term "Hun" later became the favoured epithet of Allied anti-German war propaganda during the First World War.

=== Assassination attempt ===
On 6 March 1901, during a visit to Bremen, in an apparent assassination attempt Wilhelm was struck in the face by a sharp iron object thrown at him. The assailant, identified as Johann-Dietrich Weiland, was adjudged to be insane. The Kaiser was riding in a coach to the railway station when the incident happened at 10:10 pm, and the object thrown "afterward proved to be a fishplate". The German Emperor was left with a deep wound, an inch and a half long, below his left eye; the Chief of the Naval Ministry would note later, "On the temple or in the eye the blow could have been devastating. The wonder of it is that our All-Gracious Lord felt neither the object flying at him nor, in the rain, the copiously flowing blood; it was those around him who drew his attention to it at first." Despite rumors in the press that the Kaiser had sunk into a depression, he would say in a speech at the end of the month, "nothing is more false than to pretend that my sanity has suffered in some way. I am exactly the same as I was; I have become neither elegiac nor melancholic... everything stays the same."

=== Eulenberg Scandal ===
In the years 1906–1909, Socialist journalist Maximilian Harden published accusations of homosexual activity involving ministers, courtiers, army officers, and Wilhelm's closest friend and advisor, Prince Philipp zu Eulenberg. According to Robert K. Massie:

Homosexuality was officially repressed in Germany. ... It was a criminal offense, punishable by prison, although the law was rarely invoked or enforced. Still, the very accusation could stir moral outrage and bring social ruin. This was especially true at the highest levels of Society.

The result was years of highly publicized scandals, trials, resignations, and suicides. Harden, like some in the upper echelons of the military and Foreign Office, resented Eulenberg's approval of the Anglo-French Entente, and also his encouragement of Wilhelm to rule personally. The scandal led to Wilhelm experiencing a nervous breakdown, and the removal of Eulenberg and others of his circle from the court. The view that Wilhelm was a deeply repressed homosexual or bisexual is increasingly supported by scholars: certainly, he never came to terms with any romantic aspect to his feelings for Eulenberg. Historians have linked the Eulenberg scandal to a fundamental shift in German policy that heightened its military aggressiveness and ultimately contributed to World War I.

=== Moroccan Crisis ===
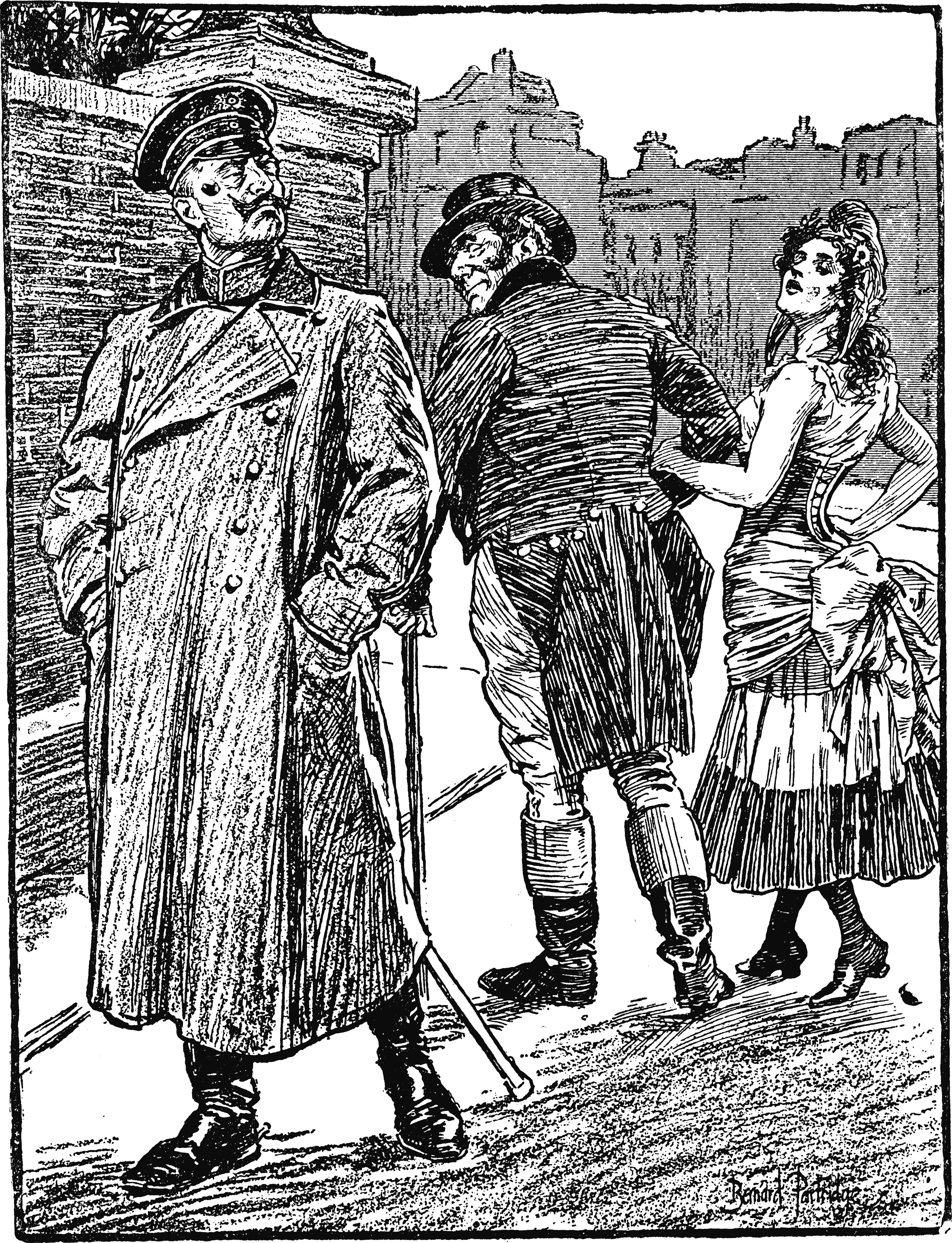
A 1904 British cartoon commenting on the Entente cordiale: John Bull walking off with Marianne, turning his back on Wilhelm II, whose sabre is shown extending from his coat

One of Wilhelm's diplomatic blunders sparked the Moroccan Crisis of 1905. He made a spectacular visit to Tangier, in Morocco on 31 March 1905. He conferred with representatives of Sultan Abdelaziz of Morocco. The Kaiser proceeded to tour the city on the back of a white horse. The Kaiser declared he had come to support the sovereignty of the Sultan—a statement which amounted to a provocative challenge to French influence in Morocco. The Sultan subsequently rejected a set of French-proposed governmental reforms and invited major world powers to a conference that advised him on necessary reforms.

The Kaiser's presence was seen as an assertion of German interests in Morocco, in opposition to those of France. In his speech, he even made remarks in favour of Moroccan independence, and this led to friction with France, which was expanding its colonial interests in Morocco, and to the Algeciras Conference, which served largely to further isolate Germany in Europe.

=== Daily Telegraph Affair ===
The Daily Telegraph Affair of 1908 involved the publication in Germany of an article from the British newspaper that included a series of wild statements and diplomatically damaging remarks. Wilhelm had viewed the article, which was based on discussions he had had with Colonel Edward Stuart-Wortley in 1907, as an opportunity to promote his views on Anglo-German friendship, but due to the content and emotional tone of many of his statements, he ended up further alienating not only the British but also the French, Russians and Japanese. He was quoted as saying that he was among the minority of Germans friendly to Britain; that during the Second Boer War, he had rebuffed the French and Russians when they asked Germany to help them "not only to save the Boer Republics, but also to humiliate England to the dust"; and that the German naval buildup was targeted against the Japanese, not Britain. One especially memorable quotation from the article was, "You English are mad, mad, mad as March hares". The effect in Germany was quite significant, with serious calls to modify the constitution to limit the emperor's powers. The Daily Telegraph crisis deeply wounded Wilhelm's previously unimpaired self-confidence, and he experienced a severe bout of depression. He kept a low profile for many months after the scandal broke, although in July 1909 he took the opportunity to force the resignation of the chancellor, Prince von Bülow, whose defence of him in the Reichstag had been aimed primarily at shifting blame from himself for not stopping the publication of the article. As a result of the scandal, Wilhelm had less influence in domestic and foreign policy for the remainder of his reign than he had previously exercised.

=== Naval arms race with Britain ===
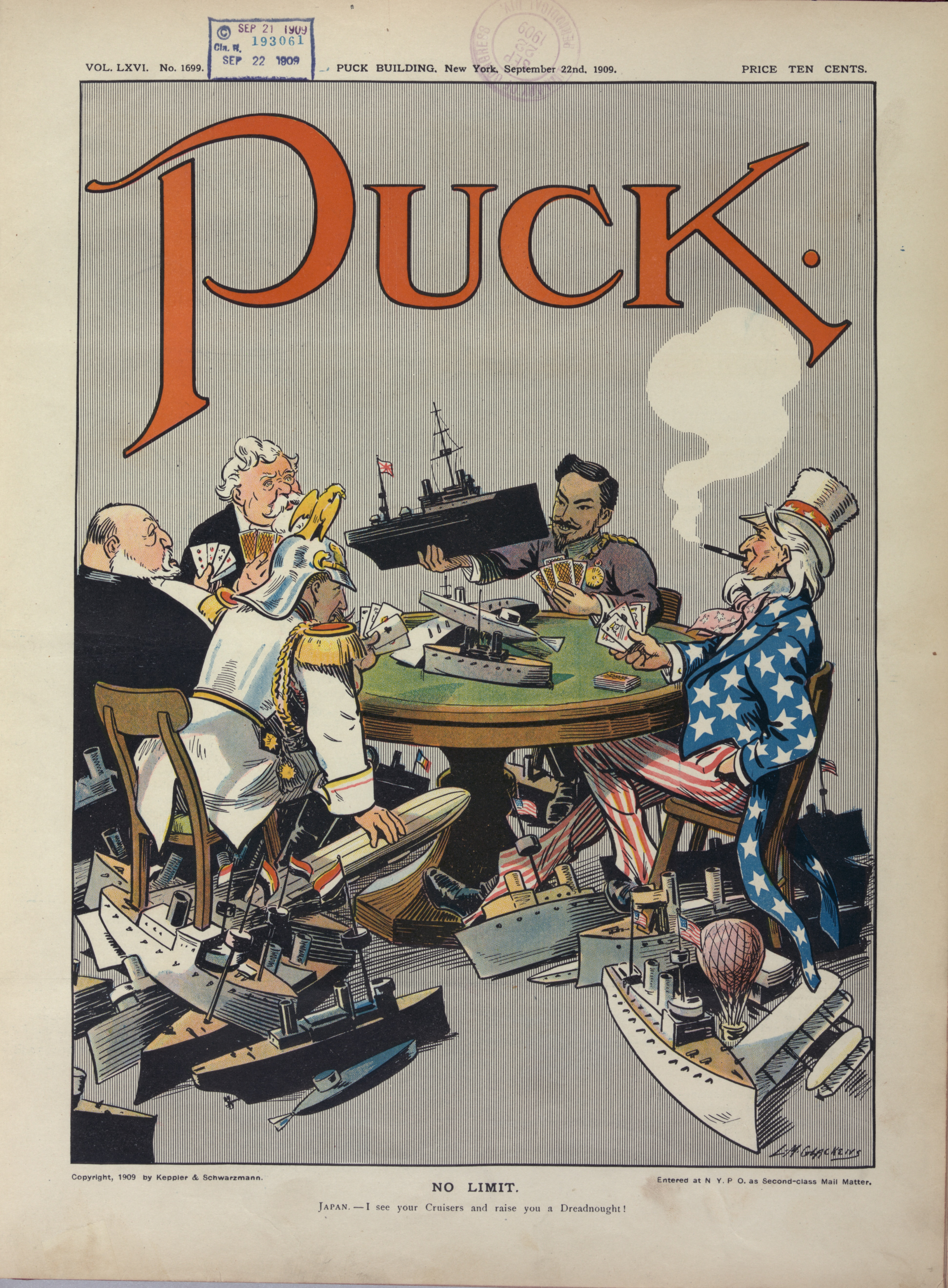
1909 cartoon in Puck shows five nations engaged in naval race; the Kaiser is in white.

Nothing Wilhelm did in the international arena was of more influence than his decision to pursue a policy of massive naval construction. A powerful navy was Wilhelm's pet project. He had inherited from his mother a love of the British Royal Navy, which was at that time the world's largest. He once confided to his uncle, the Prince of Wales, that his dream was to have a "fleet of my own some day". Wilhelm's frustration over his fleet's poor showing at the Fleet Review at his grandmother's Diamond Jubilee celebrations, combined with his inability to exert German influence in South Africa following the dispatch of the Kruger telegram, led to Wilhelm taking definitive steps toward the construction of a fleet to rival that of his British cousins. Wilhelm called on the services of the dynamic naval officer Alfred von Tirpitz, whom he appointed to the head of the Imperial Naval Office in 1897.

The new admiral had conceived of what came to be known as the "Risk Theory" or the Tirpitz Plan, by which Germany could force Britain to accede to German demands in the international arena through the threat posed by a powerful battlefleet concentrated in the North Sea. Tirpitz enjoyed Wilhelm's full support in his advocacy of successive naval bills of 1897 and 1900, by which the German navy was built up to contend with that of the British Empire. Naval expansion under the Fleet Acts eventually led to severe financial strains in Germany by 1914, as by 1906 Wilhelm had committed his navy to construction of the much larger, more expensive dreadnought type of battleship. The British depended on naval superiority and its response was to make Germany its most feared enemy.

In addition to the expansion of the fleet, the Kiel Canal was opened in 1895, enabling faster movements between the North Sea and the Baltic Sea. In 1889 Wilhelm reorganised top-level control of the navy by creating a Naval Cabinet (Marine-Kabinett) equivalent to the German Imperial Military Cabinet which had previously functioned in the same capacity for both the army and navy. The Head of the Naval Cabinet was responsible for promotions, appointments, administration, and issuing orders to naval forces. Captain Gustav von Senden-Bibran was appointed as the first head and remained so until 1906. The existing Imperial admiralty was abolished, and its responsibilities divided between two organisations. A new position was created, equivalent to the supreme commander of the army: the Chief of the High Command of the Admiralty, or Oberkommando der Marine, was responsible for ship deployments, strategy and tactics. Vice-Admiral Max von der Goltz was appointed in 1889 and remained in post until 1895. Construction and maintenance of ships and obtaining supplies was the responsibility of the State Secretary of the Imperial Navy Office (Reichsmarineamt), responsible to the Imperial Chancellor and advising the Reichstag on naval matters. The first appointee was Rear Admiral Karl Eduard Heusner, followed shortly by Rear Admiral Friedrich von Hollmann from 1890 to 1897. Each of these three heads of department reported separately to Wilhelm.

== World War I ==
Historians typically argue that Wilhelm was largely confined to ceremonial duties during the war—there were innumerable parades to review and honours to award. "The man who in peace had believed himself omnipotent became in war a 'shadow Kaiser', out of sight, neglected, and relegated to the sidelines."

=== The Sarajevo crisis ===
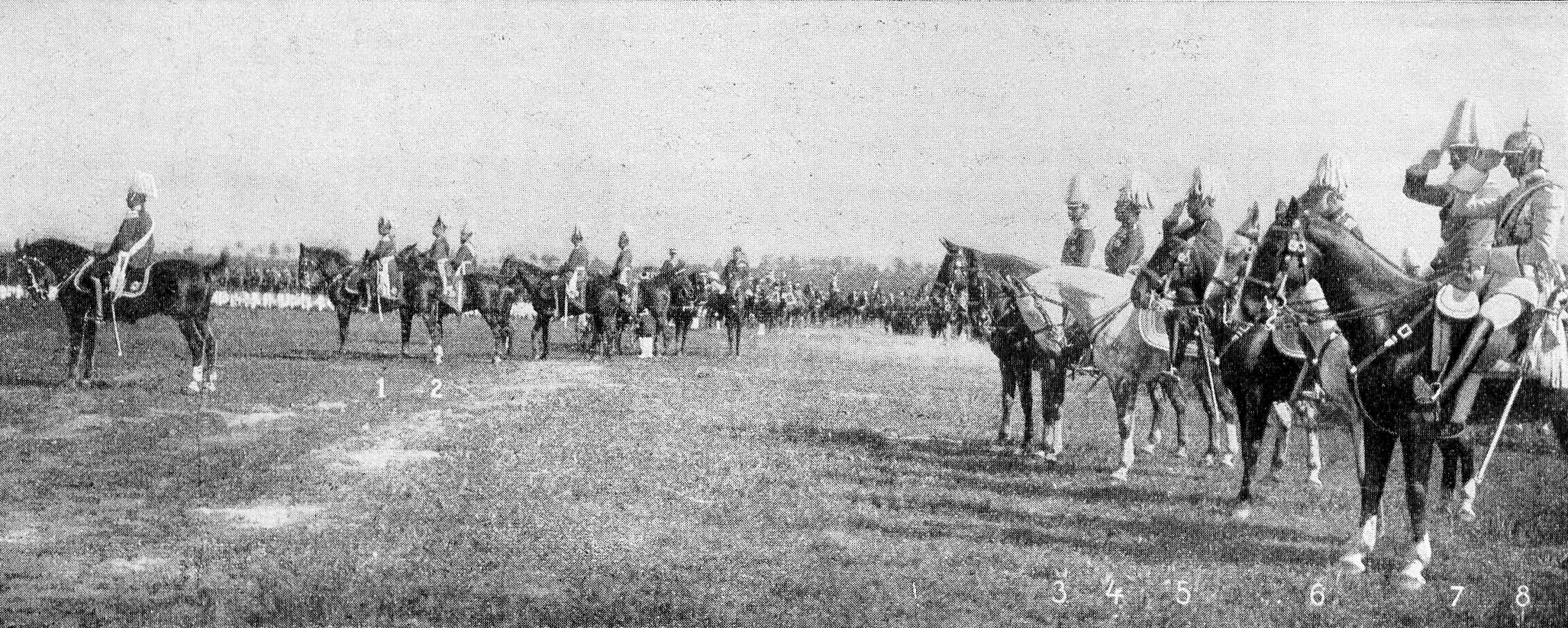
Wilhelm with the Grand Duke of Baden, Prince Oskar of Prussia, the Grand Duke of Hesse, the Grand Duke of Mecklenburg-Schwerin, Prince Louis of Bavaria, Prince Max of Baden and his son, Crown Prince Wilhelm, at pre-war military manoeuvres in autumn 1909

Wilhelm was a friend of Franz Ferdinand, and he was deeply shocked by his assassination on 28 June 1914. Wilhelm offered to support Austria-Hungary in crushing the Black Hand, the secret organisation that had plotted the killing, and even sanctioned the use of force by Austria against the source of the movement—Serbia (this is often called "the blank cheque"). He wanted to remain in Berlin until the crisis was resolved, but his courtiers persuaded him instead to go on his annual cruise of the North Sea on 6 July 1914. Wilhelm made erratic attempts to stay on top of the crisis via telegram, and when the Austro-Hungarian ultimatum was delivered to Serbia, he hurried back to Berlin. He reached Berlin on 28 July, read a copy of the Serbian reply, and wrote on it:

A brilliant solution—and in barely 48 hours! This is more than could have been expected. A great moral victory for Vienna; but with it every pretext for war falls to the ground, and [the Ambassador] Giesl had better have stayed quietly at Belgrade. On this document, I should never have given orders for mobilisation.

Unknown to the Emperor, Austro-Hungarian ministers and generals had already convinced the 83-year-old Franz Joseph I to sign a declaration of war against Serbia. As a direct consequence, Russia began a general mobilisation to attack Austria in defence of Serbia.

=== July 1914 ===
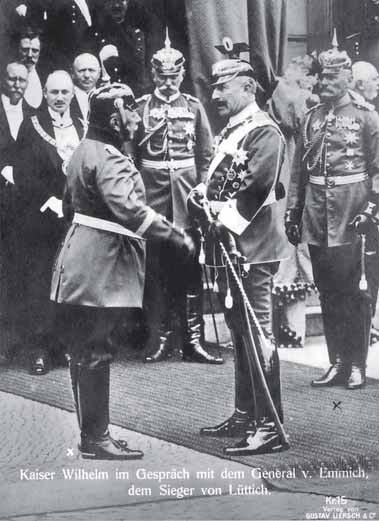
Wilhelm conversing with the victor of Liège, General Otto von Emmich; in the background the generals Hans von Plessen (middle) and Moriz von Lyncker (right)

On the night of 30 July 1914, when handed a document stating that Russia would not cancel its mobilisation, Wilhelm wrote a lengthy commentary containing these observations:

For I no longer have any doubt that England, Russia and France have agreed among themselves—knowing that our treaty obligations compel us to support Austria—to use the Austro-Serb conflict as a pretext for waging a war of annihilation against us ... Our dilemma over keeping faith with the old and honourable Emperor has been exploited to create a situation which gives England the excuse she has been seeking to annihilate us with a spurious appearance of justice on the pretext that she is helping France and maintaining the well-known Balance of Power in Europe, i.e., playing off all European States for her own benefit against us.

More recent British authors state that Wilhelm II really declared, "Ruthlessness and weakness will start the most terrifying war of the world, whose purpose is to destroy Germany. Because there can no longer be any doubts, England, France and Russia have conspired themselves together to fight an annihilation war against us".

An das deutsche Volk
Extract from Wilhelm's public address for mobilisation, 6 August 1914.

When it became clear that Germany would experience a war on two fronts and that Britain would enter the war if Germany attacked France through neutral Belgium, the panic-stricken Wilhelm attempted to redirect the main attack against Russia. When Helmuth von Moltke (the younger) (who had chosen the old plan from 1905, made by General von Schlieffen for the possibility of German war on two fronts) told him that this was impossible, Wilhelm said: "Your uncle would have given me a different answer!" Wilhelm is also reported to have said, "To think that George and Nicky should have played me false! If my grandmother had been alive, she would never have allowed it." In the original Schlieffen Plan, Germany would attack the (supposed) weaker enemy first, meaning France. The plan supposed that it would take a long time before Russia was ready for war. Defeating France had been easy for Prussia in the Franco-Prussian War in 1870. At the 1914 border between France and Germany, an attack at this more southern part of France could be stopped by the French fortress along the border. However, Wilhelm II stopped any invasion of the Netherlands.

=== Early war ===
On 1 August 1914 (Saturday), Wilhelm II made a war speech in front of a great crowd. On Monday, he motored back to Berlin from Potsdam and issued an imperial order to convene the Reichstag the next day.

On 19 August 1914, Wilhelm II predicted that Germany would win the war. He said, "I am firmly confident that, with the help of God, the bravery of the German Army and Navy and the unquenchable unanimity of the German people during those hours of danger, victory will crown our cause."

=== Shadow-Kaiser ===
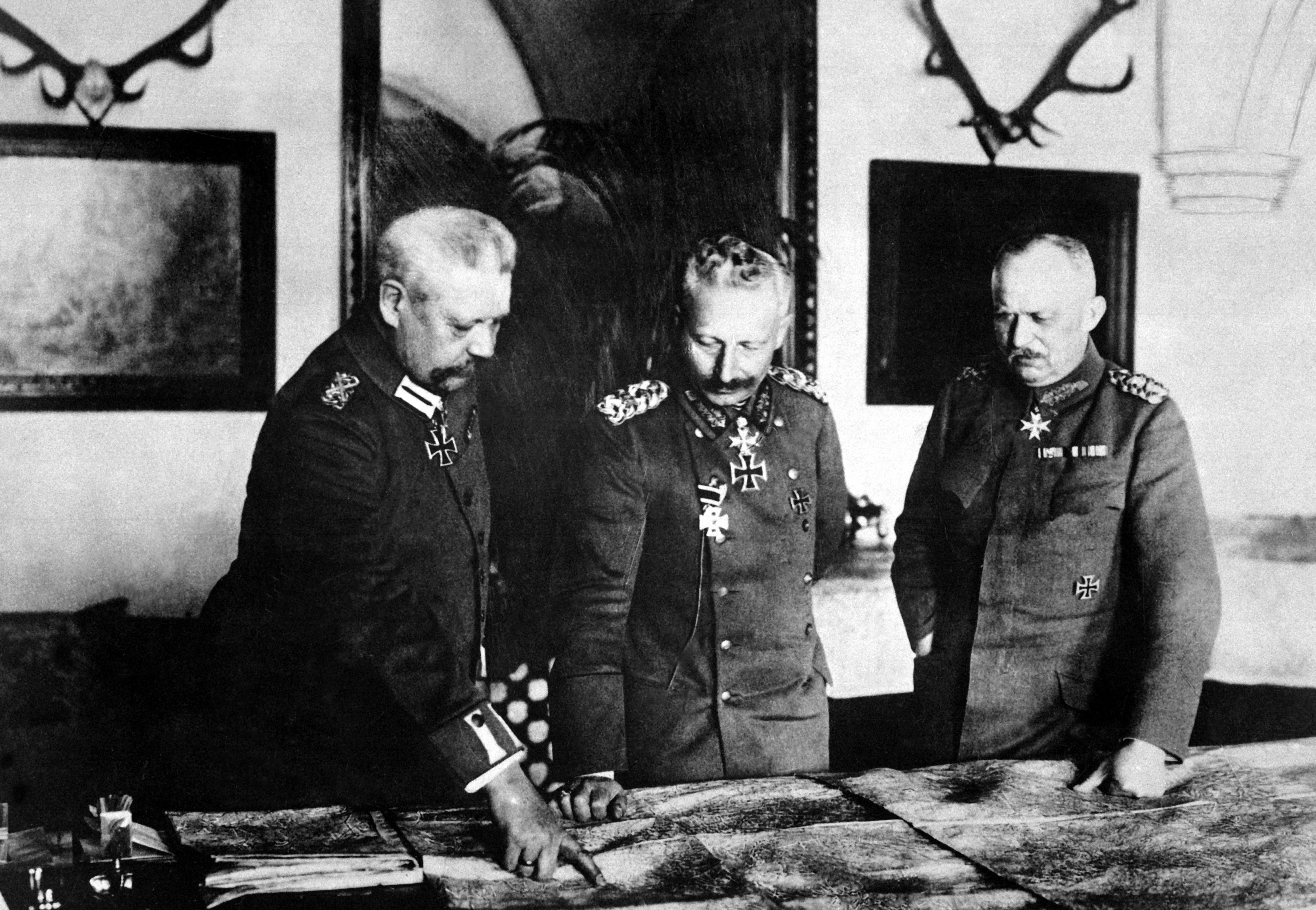
Hindenburg, Wilhelm, and Ludendorff in January 1917

Wilhelm's role in wartime was one of ever-decreasing power as he increasingly handled awards ceremonies and honorific duties. The high command continued with its strategy even when it was clear that the Schlieffen plan had failed. By 1916, the Empire had effectively become a military dictatorship under the control of Field Marshal Paul von Hindenburg and General Erich Ludendorff. Increasingly cut off from reality and the political decision-making process, Wilhelm vacillated between defeatism and dreams of victory, depending upon the fortunes of his armies. Nevertheless, Wilhelm still retained the ultimate authority in matters of political appointment, and it was only after his consent had been gained that major changes to the high command could be brought about. Wilhelm was in favour of the dismissal of Colonel General Helmuth von Moltke in September 1914 and his replacement by General Erich von Falkenhayn. In 1917, Hindenburg and Ludendorff decided that Bethman-Hollweg was no longer acceptable to them as Chancellor and called upon the Kaiser to appoint somebody else. When asked whom they would accept, Ludendorff recommended Georg Michaelis, a nonentity whom he barely knew. Despite this, the Kaiser accepted the suggestion. Upon hearing in July 1917 that his cousin George V had changed the name of the British royal house to Windsor, Wilhelm remarked that he planned to see Shakespeare's play "The Merry Wives of Saxe-Coburg-Gotha". The Kaiser's support base collapsed completely in October–November 1918 in the military, the civilian government, and in German public opinion, as President Woodrow Wilson made it very clear that the monarchy must be overthrown before an end of the war could take place. That year also saw Wilhelm sickened during the worldwide Spanish flu outbreak, though he survived.

== Abdication and exile ==
Wilhelm was at the Imperial Army headquarters in Spa, Belgium, when the uprisings in Berlin and other centres took him by surprise in late 1918. Mutiny among the ranks of his beloved Kaiserliche Marine, the imperial navy, profoundly shocked him. After the outbreak of the German Revolution, Wilhelm could not make up his mind whether to abdicate. Up to that point, he accepted that he would likely have to give up the imperial crown, but still hoped to retain the Prussian kingship. He believed that as ruler of two-thirds of Germany, he would still be a key player in any new system. However, this was impossible under the imperial constitution. Wilhelm thought he ruled as emperor in a personal union with Prussia. In truth, the constitution defined the empire as a confederation of states under the permanent presidency of Prussia. The imperial crown was thus tied to the Prussian crown, meaning that Wilhelm could not renounce one crown without renouncing the other.

Wilhelm's hope of retaining at least one of his crowns was revealed as unrealistic when, in the hope of preserving the monarchy in the face of growing revolutionary unrest, Chancellor Prince Max of Baden announced Wilhelm's abdication of both titles on 9 November 1918. Prince Max himself was forced to resign later the same day, when it became clear that only Friedrich Ebert, leader of the SPD, could effectively exert control. Later that day, one of Ebert's secretaries of state (ministers), Social Democrat Philipp Scheidemann, proclaimed Germany a republic.

Wilhelm accepted this fait accompli only after Ludendorff's replacement, General Wilhelm Groener, had informed him that the officers and men of the army would march back in good order under Hindenburg's command, but would certainly not fight for Wilhelm's throne. The monarchy's last and strongest support had been broken, and finally even Hindenburg, himself a lifelong monarchist, was obliged, after polling his generals, to advise the Emperor to give up the crown. On 10 November, Wilhelm crossed the border by train and went into exile in the neutral Netherlands. Upon the conclusion of the Treaty of Versailles in early 1919, Article 227 expressly provided for the prosecution of Wilhelm "for a supreme offence against international morality and the sanctity of treaties", but the Dutch government refused to extradite him. King George V wrote that he looked on his cousin as "the greatest criminal in history" but opposed Prime Minister David Lloyd George's proposal to "hang the Kaiser". There was little zeal in Britain to prosecute. On 1 January 1920, it was stated in official circles in London that Great Britain would "welcome refusal by Holland to deliver the former kaiser for trial," and it was hinted that this had been conveyed to the Dutch government through diplomatic channels:

Punishment of the former kaiser and other German war criminals is worrying Great Britain little, it was said. As a matter of form, however, the British and French governments were expected to request Holland for the former kaiser's extradition. Holland, it was said, will refuse on the ground of constitutional provisions covering the case and then the matter will be dropped. The request for extradition will not be based on genuine desire on the part of British officials to bring the kaiser to trial, according to authoritative information, but is considered necessary formality to 'save the face' of politicians who promised to see that Wilhelm was punished for his crimes.

President Woodrow Wilson of the United States opposed extradition, arguing that prosecuting Wilhelm would destabilise international order and lose the peace.

Wilhelm first settled in Amerongen, where on 28 November he issued a belated statement of abdication from both the Prussian and imperial thrones, thus formally ending the Hohenzollerns' 500-year rule over Prussia and its predecessor state, Brandenburg. Finally accepting the reality that he had lost both of his crowns for good, he gave up his rights to "the throne of Prussia and to the German Imperial throne connected therewith". He also released his soldiers and officials in both Prussia and the empire from their oath of loyalty to him. He purchased a country house in the municipality of Doorn, known as Huis Doorn, and moved in on 15 May 1920. This was to be his home for the remainder of his life. The Weimar Republic allowed Wilhelm to remove twenty-three railway wagons of furniture, twenty-seven containing packages of all sorts, one bearing a car and another a boat, from the New Palace at Potsdam.

== Life in exile ==
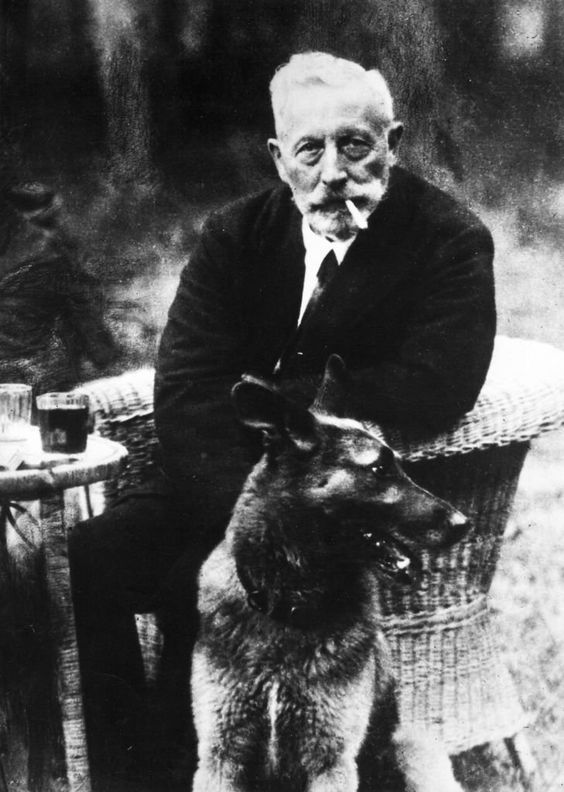
Kaiser Wilhelm II and his dog in exile. Doorn, 1938

In 1922, Wilhelm published the first volume of his memoirs—a very slim volume that insisted he was not guilty of initiating the Great War, and defended his conduct throughout his reign, especially in matters of foreign policy. For the remaining twenty years of his life, he entertained guests (often of some standing) and kept himself updated on events in Europe. He grew a beard and allowed his famous moustache to droop, adopting a style very similar to that of his cousins King George V and Tsar Nicholas II. He also learned the Dutch language. Wilhelm had developed a penchant for archaeology while residing at the Corfu Achilleion, excavating at the site of the Temple of Artemis in Corfu, a passion he retained in his exile. He had bought the former Greek residence of Empress Elisabeth after her murder in 1898. He also sketched plans for grand buildings and battleships when he was bored. In exile, one of Wilhelm's greatest passions was hunting, and he killed thousands of animals, both beast and bird. Much of his time was spent chopping wood and thousands of trees were chopped down during his stay at Doorn.

=== Wealth ===
Wilhelm II was seen as the richest man in Germany before 1914. After his abdication he retained substantial wealth. It was reported that at least 60 railway wagons were needed to carry his furniture, art, porcelain and silver from Germany to the Netherlands. The Kaiser retained substantial cash reserves as well as several palaces. After 1945, the Hohenzollerns' forests, farms, factories and palaces in what became East Germany were expropriated and thousands of artworks were subsumed into state-owned museums.

=== Views on Nazism ===
In the early 1930s, Wilhelm apparently hoped that the successes of the Nazi Party would stimulate interest in a restoration of the House of Hohenzollern, with his eldest grandson as the new Kaiser. His second wife, Hermine, actively petitioned the Nazi government on her husband's behalf. However, Adolf Hitler, despite being a veteran of the Imperial German Army during the First World War, felt nothing but contempt for the man he blamed for Germany's greatest defeat, and the petitions were ignored. Though he played host to Hermann Göring at Doorn on at least one occasion, Wilhelm learned to distrust Hitler. Hearing of the murder of the wife of former Chancellor Kurt von Schleicher during the Night of the Long Knives, Wilhelm said, "We have ceased to live under the rule of law and everyone must be prepared for the possibility that the Nazis will push their way in and put them up against the wall!"

Wilhelm was also appalled at the Kristallnacht of 9–10 November 1938, saying "I have just made my views clear to Auwi [August Wilhelm, Wilhelm's fourth son] in the presence of his brothers. He had the nerve to say that he agreed with the Jewish pogroms and understood why they had come about. When I told him that any decent man would describe these actions as gangsterisms, he appeared totally indifferent. He is completely lost to our family". Wilhelm also stated, "For the first time, I am ashamed to be a German":

There's a man alone, without family, without children, without God [...] He builds legions, but he doesn't build a nation. A nation is created by families, a religion, traditions: it is made up out of the hearts of mothers, the wisdom of fathers, the joy and the exuberance of children [...] For a few months I was inclined to believe in National Socialism. I thought of it as a necessary fever. And I was gratified to see that there were, associated with it for a time, some of the wisest and most outstanding Germans. But these, one by one, he has got rid of, or even killed ... Papen, Schleicher, Neurath – and even Blomberg. He has nothing left but a bunch of shirted gangsters! [...] This man could bring home victories to our people each year, without bringing them either glory or (danger). But of our Germany, which was a nation of poets and musicians, of artists and soldiers, he has made a nation of hysterics and hermits, engulfed in a mob and led by a thousand liars or fanatics.

— Wilhelm on Hitler, December 1938

In the wake of the German victory over Poland in September 1939, Wilhelm's adjutant, Wilhelm von Dommes, wrote on his behalf to Hitler, stating that the House of Hohenzollern "remained loyal" and noted that nine Prussian Princes (one son and eight grandchildren) were stationed at the front, concluding "because of the special circumstances that require residence in a neutral foreign country, His Majesty must personally decline to make the aforementioned comment. The Emperor has therefore charged me with making a communication." Wilhelm greatly admired the success which the Wehrmacht was able to achieve in the opening months of the Second World War, and personally sent Hitler a congratulatory telegram when the Netherlands surrendered in May 1940: "My Führer, I congratulate you and hope that under your marvellous leadership the German monarchy will be restored completely." Unimpressed, Hitler commented to Heinz Linge, his valet, "What an idiot!"

Upon the fall of Paris a month later, Wilhelm sent another telegram: "Under the deeply moving impression of France's capitulation I congratulate you and all the German armed forces on the God-given prodigious victory with the words of Kaiser Wilhelm the Great of the year 1870: 'What a turn of events through God's dispensation!' All German hearts are filled with the chorale of Leuthen, which the victors of Leuthen, the soldiers of the Great King sang: 'Now thank we all our God!'" In a letter to his daughter Victoria Louise, Duchess of Brunswick, he wrote triumphantly, "Thus is the pernicious Entente Cordiale of Uncle Edward VII brought to nought." In a September 1940 letter to an American journalist, Wilhelm praised Germany's rapid early conquests as "a succession of miracles", but remarked also that "the brilliant leading Generals in this war came from My school, they fought under my command in the World War as lieutenants, captains and young majors. Educated by Schlieffen they put the plans he had worked out under me into practice along the same lines as we did in 1914." Hitler, on the other hand, in one of his speeches in 1940, specifically stated that the downfall of Germany in the First World War was due to the country's "poor leadership" at that time.

After the German conquest of the Netherlands in 1940, the aging Wilhelm retired completely from public life. In May 1940, Wilhelm declined an offer from Winston Churchill of asylum in Great Britain, preferring to die at Huis Doorn.

=== Anti-English, antisemitic, and anti-Freemason views ===
During his last year at Doorn, Wilhelm believed that Germany was still the land of monarchy and Christianity, while England was the land of classical liberalism and therefore of Satan and the Antichrist. He argued that the English nobility were "Freemasons thoroughly infected by Juda". Wilhelm asserted that the "British people must be liberated from Antichrist Juda. We must drive Juda out of England just as he has been chased out of the Continent."

He also believed a conspiracy theory that Anglo-American Freemasonry and the Jews had caused both world wars, and were aiming for a world empire financed by British and American gold, but that "Juda's plan has been smashed to pieces and they themselves swept out of the European Continent!" Continental Europe was now, Wilhelm wrote, "consolidating and closing itself off from British influences after the elimination of the British and the Jews!" The result would be a "U.S. of Europe!" In a 1940 letter to his sister Princess Margaret, Wilhelm wrote: "The hand of God is creating a new world & working ... We are becoming the U.S. of Europe under German leadership, a united European Continent." He added: "The Jews [are] being thrust out of their nefarious positions in all countries, whom they have driven to hostility for centuries."

Also, in 1940 came what would have been his mother's 100th birthday. Despite their very troubled relationship, Wilhelm wrote to a friend, "Today the 100th birthday of my mother! No notice is taken of it at home! No 'Memorial Service' or ... committee to remember her marvellous work for the ... welfare of our German people ... Nobody of the new generation knows anything about her."

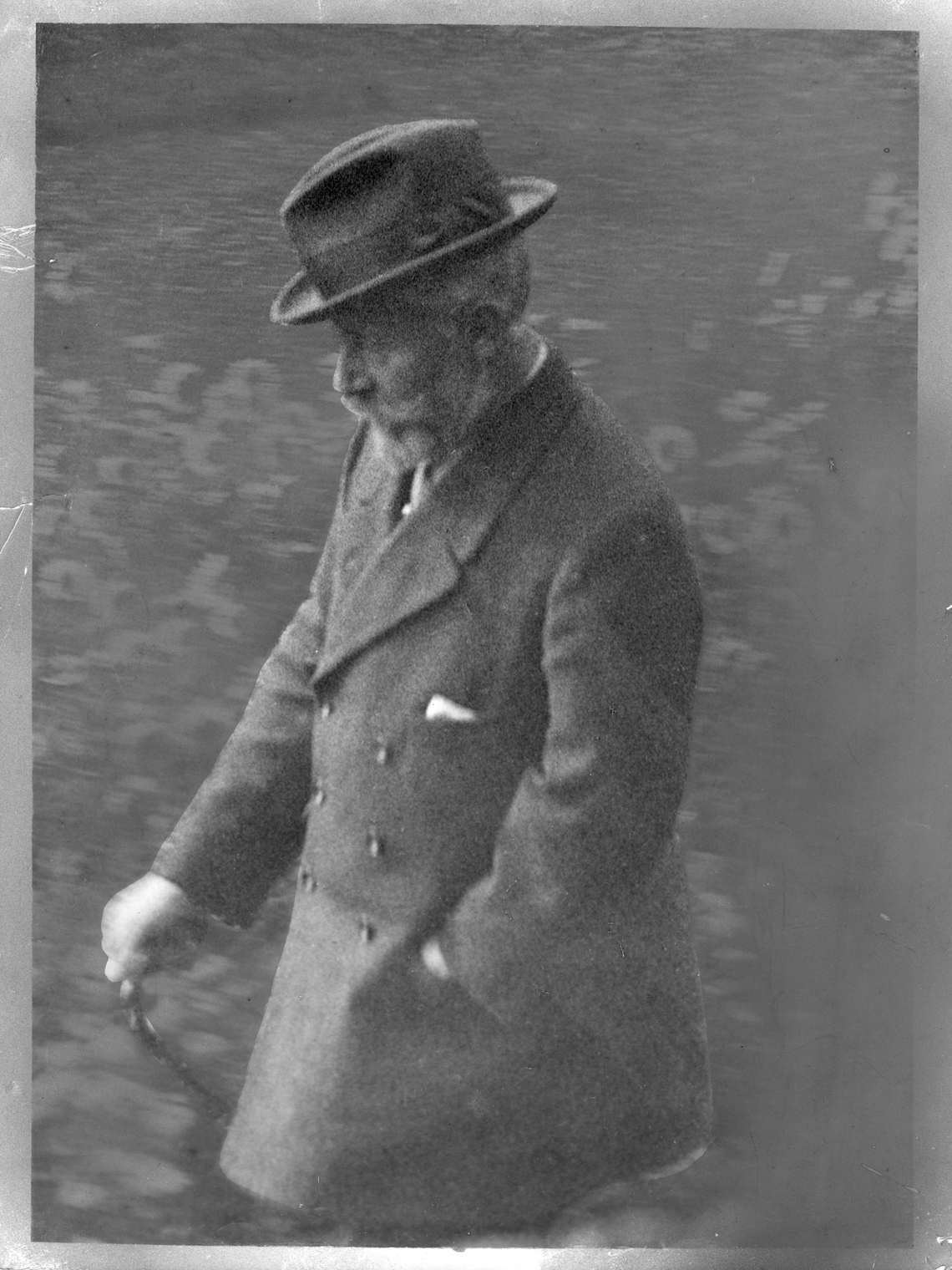
Wilhelm in Amerongen, 1919

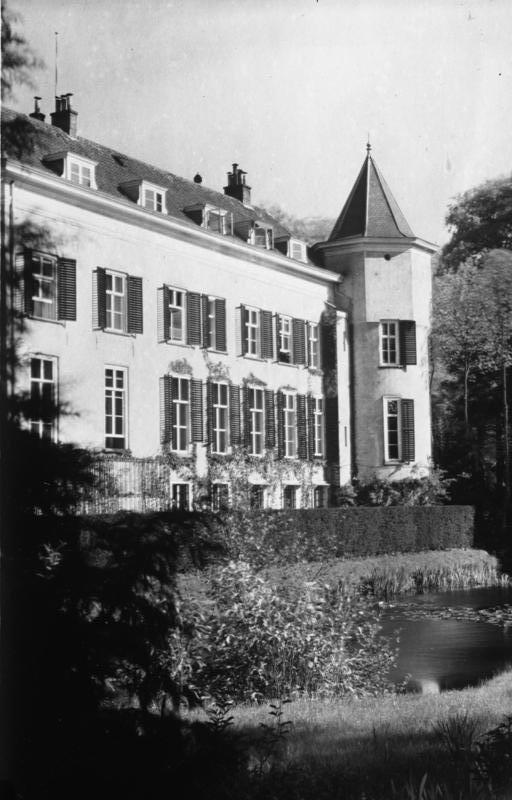
Huis Doorn in 1925

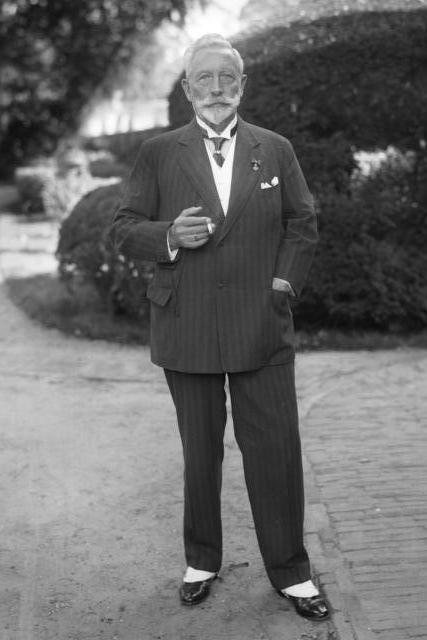
Wilhelm in 1933

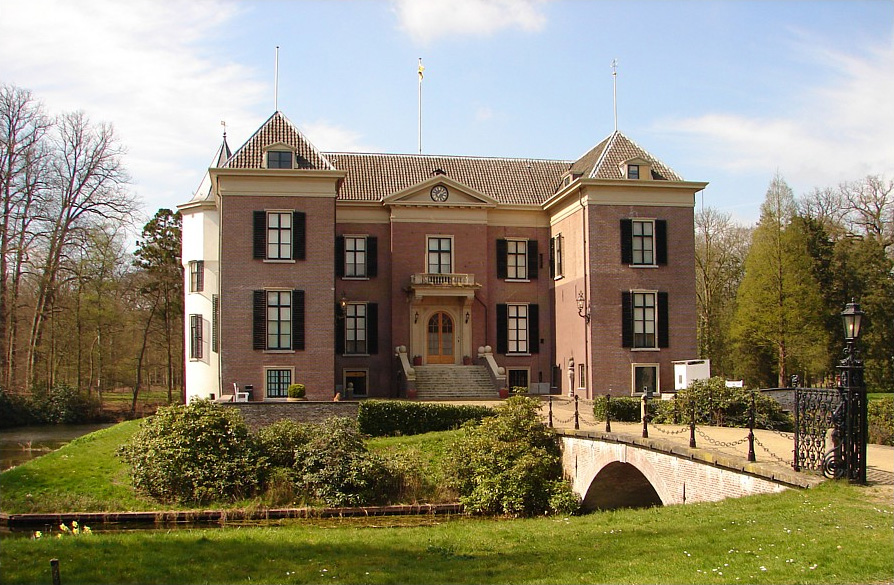
Huis Doorn in October 2004

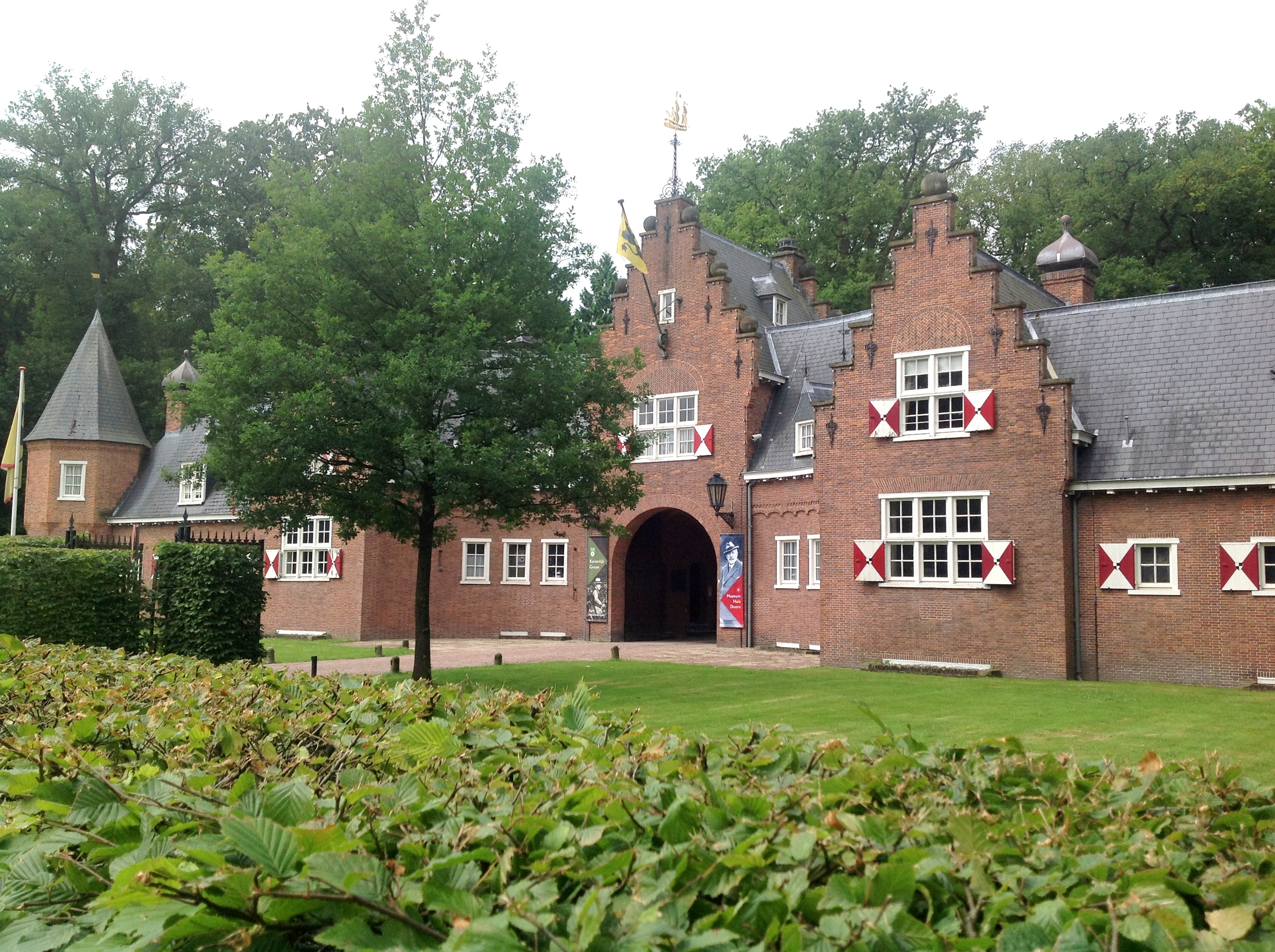
Gatehouse built in the 1920s, commissioned by Wilhelm.

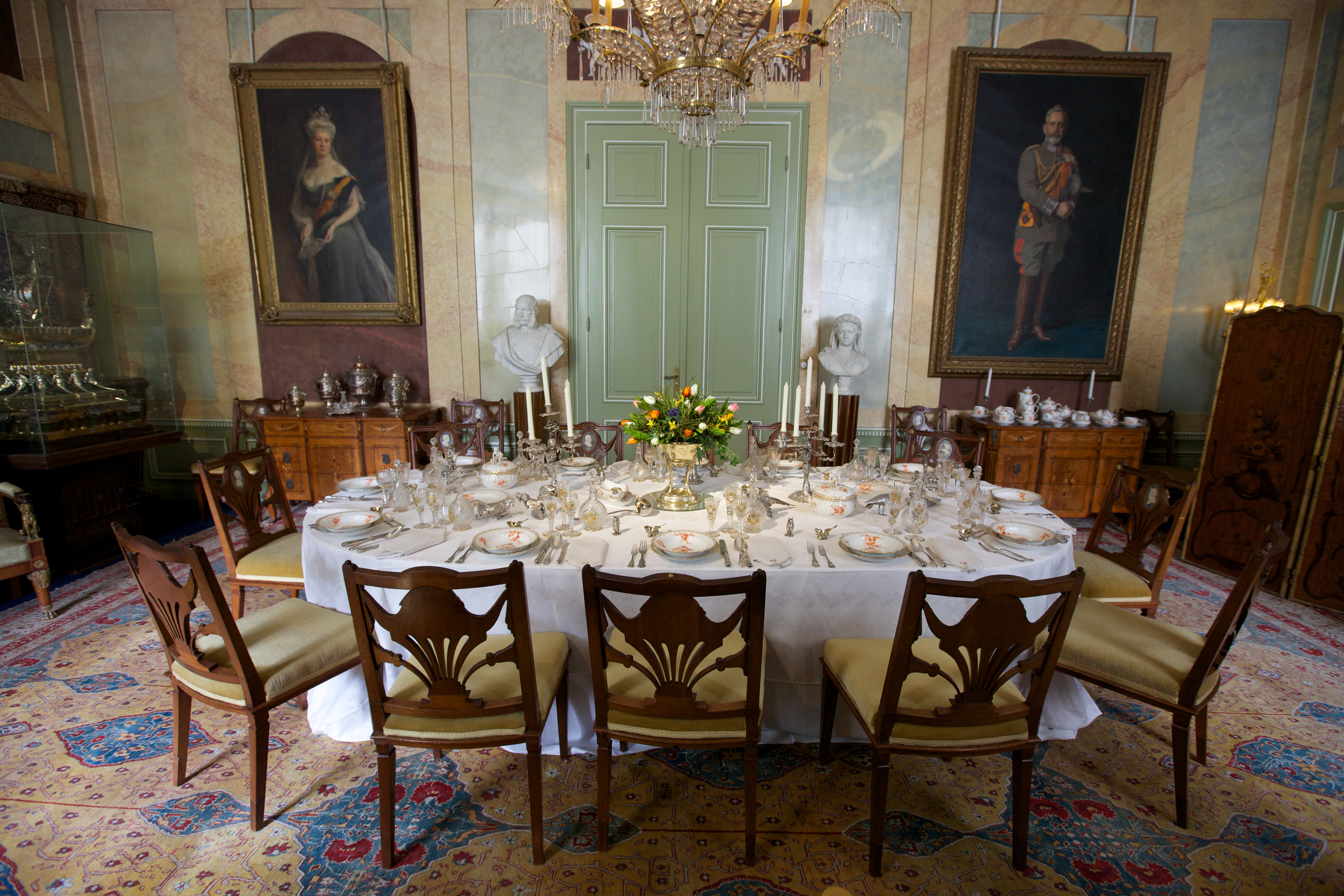
The dining room in 2013.

== Death ==
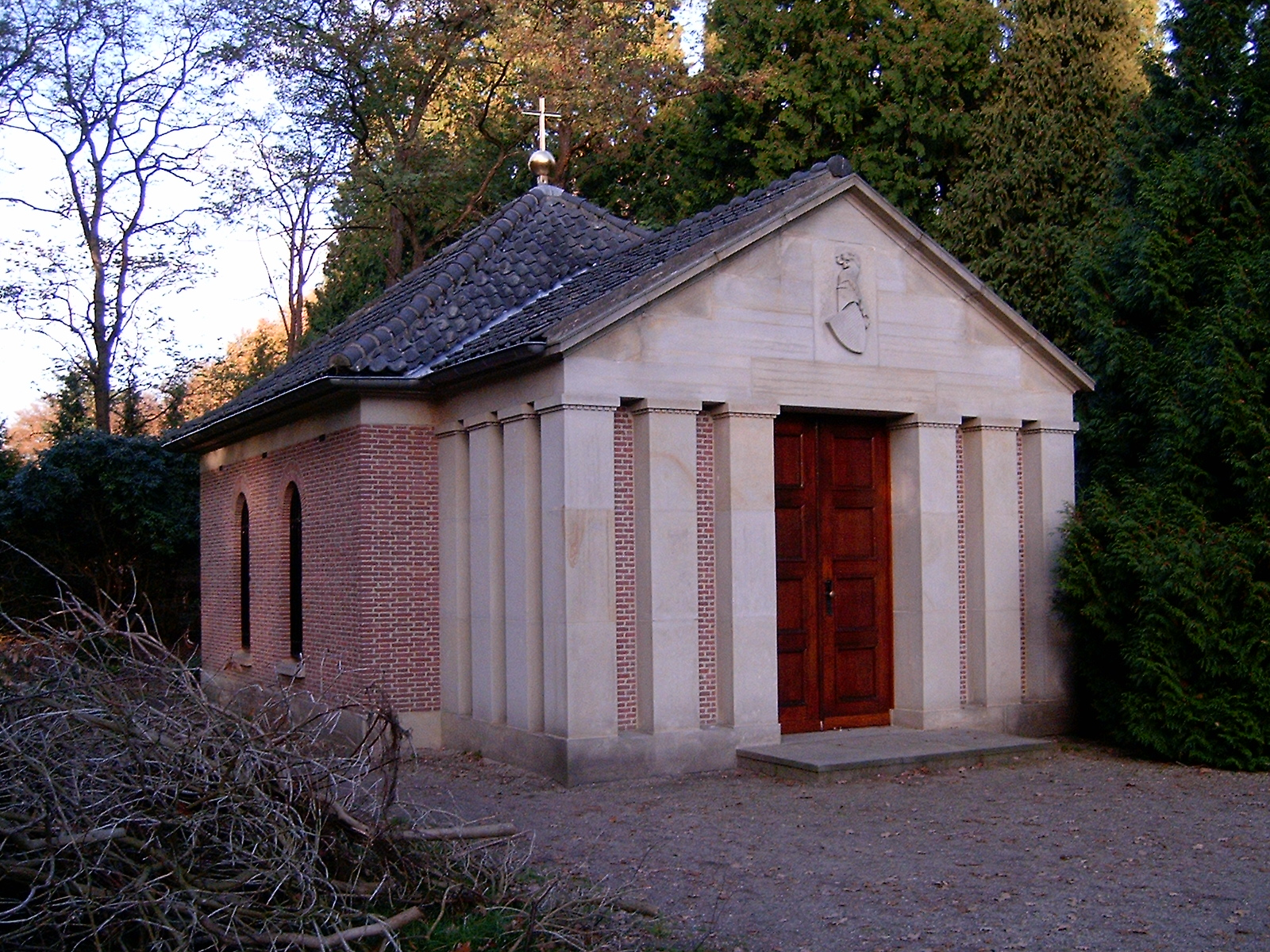
Wilhelm's tomb at Huis Doorn

Wilhelm died of a pulmonary embolism in Doorn, Netherlands, on 4 June 1941, aged 82, just weeks before the Axis invasion of the Soviet Union. Despite his personal resentment and animosity toward the monarchy, Hitler wanted to bring the Kaiser's body back to Berlin for a state funeral, believing that a funeral in which he presented himself as heir apparent to the throne could be used for propaganda. However, Wilhelm had ordered that his body not be returned to Germany unless the monarchy had first been restored. His wishes were respected.

The Nazi occupation authorities arranged for a small military funeral, with a few hundred people present. The mourners included Field Marshal August von Mackensen, fully dressed in his old Imperial Hussars uniform, former World War I Office of Naval Intelligence field agent Admiral Wilhelm Canaris, Colonel General Curt Haase, World War I flying ace turned Wehrmachtbefehlshaber for the Netherlands General Friedrich Christiansen, and Reichskommissar for the Netherlands Arthur Seyss-Inquart, along with a few other military advisers. Wilhelm's instruction that swastikas and Nazi Party regalia not be displayed at his funeral was ignored, as photographs taken by a Dutch photographer show.

Wilhelm was buried in a mausoleum on the grounds of Huis Doorn, now a museum. The site has since become a place of pilgrimage for German monarchists, who gather there annually on the anniversary of his death to pay homage to the last German Emperor. In 2018, addressing these gatherings, the museum's director stated: "we don't honour Kaiser Wilhelm here".

== Historiography ==
Three trends have characterised the writing about Wilhelm. First, the court-inspired writers considered him a martyr and a hero, often uncritically accepting the justifications provided in the Kaiser's own memoirs. Second, there came those who judged Wilhelm to be completely unable to handle the great responsibilities of his position, a ruler too reckless to deal with power. Third, after 1950, later scholars have sought to transcend the passions of the early 20th century and attempted an objective portrayal of Wilhelm and his rule.

On 8 June 1913, a year before the First World War began, The New York Times published a special supplement devoted to the 25th anniversary of the Kaiser's accession. The banner headline read: "Kaiser, 25 Years a Ruler, Hailed as Chief Peacemaker". The accompanying story called him "the greatest factor for peace that our time can show", and credited Wilhelm with frequently rescuing Europe from the brink of war.

Until the late 1950s, Germany under the last Kaiser was depicted by most historians as an almost absolute monarchy. Partly, however, this was a deliberate deception by German civil servants and elected officials. For example, former President Theodore Roosevelt believed the Kaiser was in control of German foreign policy because Hermann Speck von Sternburg, the German ambassador in Washington and a personal friend of Roosevelt, presented to the President messages from Chancellor von Bülow as though they were messages from the Kaiser. Later historians downplayed his role, arguing that senior officials regularly learned to work around the Kaiser's back. More recently, historian John C. G. Röhl has portrayed Wilhelm as the key figure in understanding the recklessness and downfall of Imperial Germany. Thus, the argument is still made that the Kaiser played a major role in promoting the policies of both naval and colonialist expansion that caused the deterioration of Germany's relations with Britain before 1914.

== Marriages and issue ==
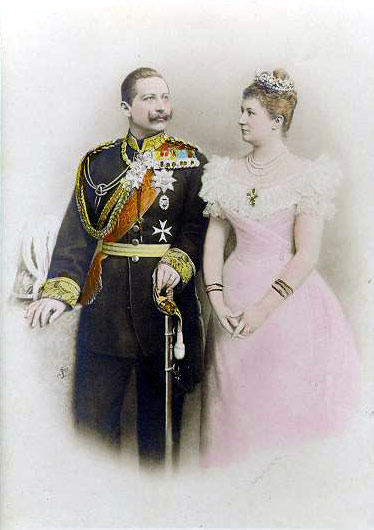
Wilhelm and his first wife, Augusta Victoria

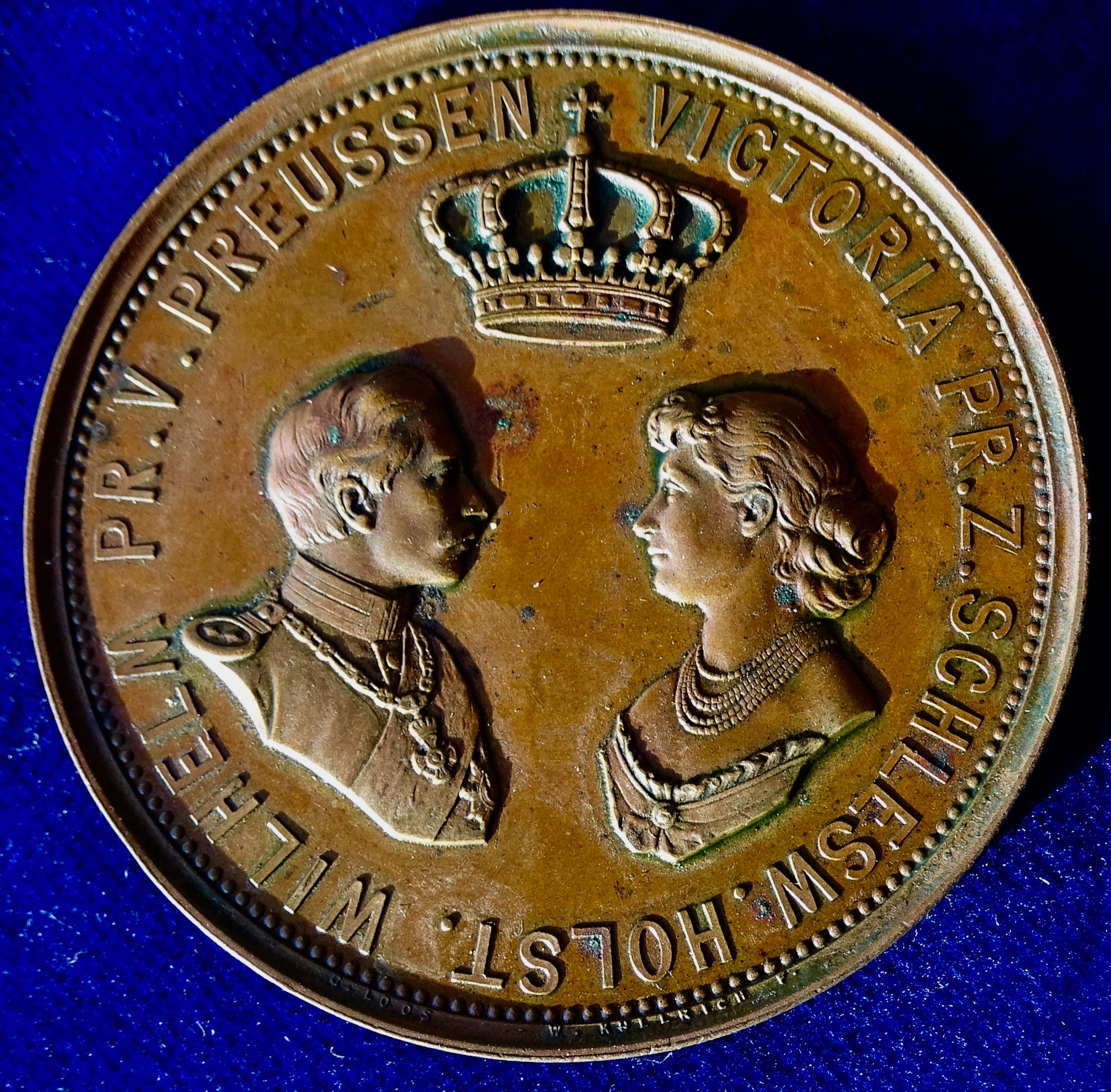
Wedding medal of Prince Wilhelm and Princess Augusta, obverse

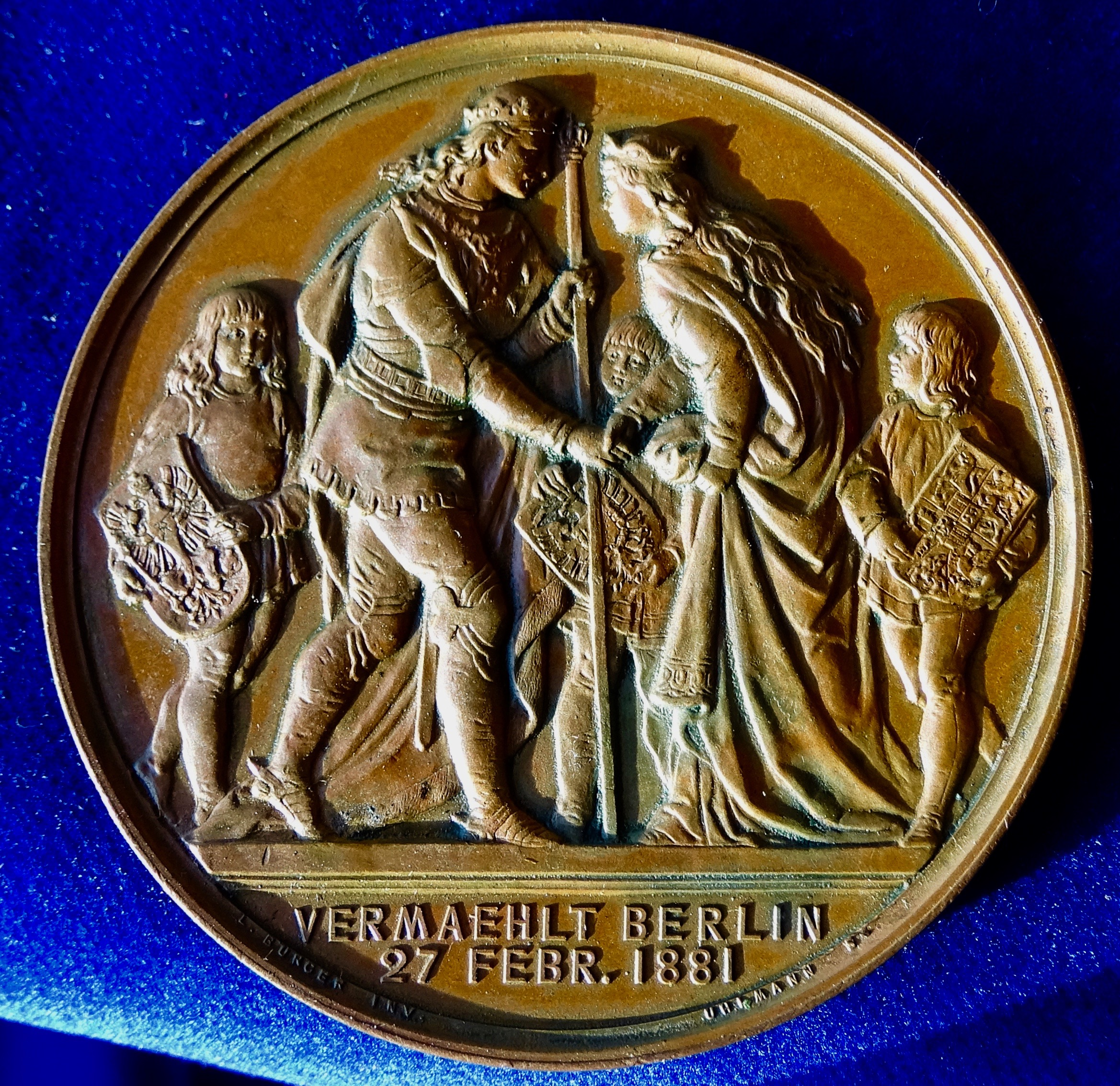
The reverse shows the couple in medieval costumes in front of 3 squires carrying the shields of Prussia, Germany, and Schleswig-Holstein.

Wilhelm and his first wife, Augusta Victoria of Schleswig-Holstein, were married on 27 February 1881. They had seven children:

Name	Birth	Death	Spouse	Children
Crown Prince Wilhelm	6 May 1882	20 July 1951	Duchess Cecilie of Mecklenburg-Schwerin (Married 1905)	Prince Wilhelm (1906–1940); Prince Louis Ferdinand (1907–1994); Prince Hubertus (1909–1950); Prince Frederick (1911–1966); Princess Alexandrine (1915–1980); Princess Cecilie (1917–1975)
Prince Eitel Friedrich	7 July 1883	8 December 1942	Duchess Sophia Charlotte of Oldenburg (Married 1906; Divorced 1926)	
Prince Adalbert	14 July 1884	22 September 1948	Princess Adelaide of Saxe-Meiningen (Married 1914)	Princess Victoria Marina (1915); Princess Victoria Marina (1917–1981); Prince Wilhelm Victor (1919–1989)
Prince August Wilhelm	29 January 1887	25 March 1949	Princess Alexandra Victoria of Schleswig-Holstein-Sonderburg-Glücksburg (Married 1908; Divorced 1920)	Prince Alexander Ferdinand (1912–1985)
Prince Oskar	27 July 1888	27 January 1958	Countess Ina Marie von Bassewitz (Married 1914)	Prince Oskar (1915–1939); Prince Burchard (1917–1988); Princess Herzeleide (1918–1989); Prince Wilhelm-Karl (1922–2007)
Prince Joachim	17 December 1890	18 July 1920	Princess Marie-Auguste of Anhalt (Married 1916; Divorced 1919)	Prince Karl Franz (1916–1975)
Princess Victoria Louise	13 September 1892	11 December 1980	Ernest Augustus, Duke of Brunswick (Married 1913)	Prince Ernest Augustus (1914–1987); Prince George William (1915–2006); Princess Frederica (1917–1981); Prince Christian Oscar (1919–1981); Prince Welf Henry (1923–1997)

Empress Augusta, known affectionately as "Dona", was a constant companion to Wilhelm, and her death from a heart attack on 11 April 1921 was a devastating blow. It also came less than a year after their son Joachim committed suicide.

=== Remarriage ===
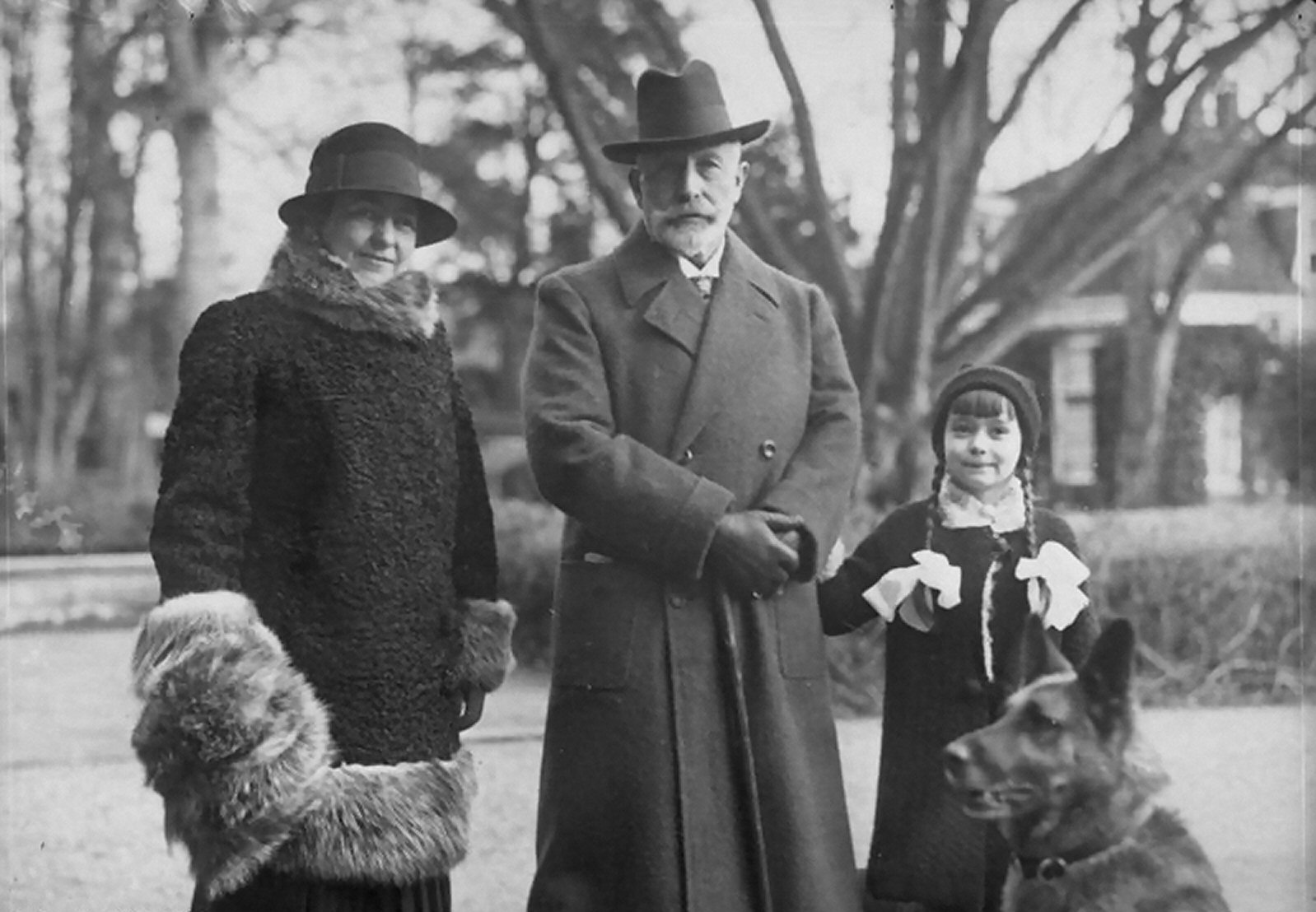
With second wife, Hermine, and her daughter, Princess Henriette

The following January, Wilhelm received a birthday greeting from a son of the late Prince Johann George Ludwig Ferdinand August Wilhelm of Schönaich-Carolath. The 63-year-old Wilhelm invited the boy and his mother, Princess Hermine Reuss of Greiz, to Doorn. Wilhelm found 35-year-old Hermine very attractive, and greatly enjoyed her company. The couple were wed in Doorn on 5 November 1922 despite the objections of Wilhelm's monarchist supporters and his children. Hermine's daughter, Princess Henriette, married the late Prince Joachim's son, Karl Franz Josef, in 1940, but divorced in 1946. Hermine remained a constant companion to the aging former emperor until his death.

== Religion ==
=== Own views ===
In accordance with his role as the King of Prussia, Emperor Wilhelm II was a Lutheran member of the Evangelical State Church of Prussia's older Provinces. It was a United Protestant denomination, bringing together Reformed and Lutheran believers.

=== Attitude towards Islam ===
Wilhelm II was on friendly terms with the Muslim world. He described himself as a "friend" to "300 million Mohammedans". Following his trip to Constantinople (which he visited three times—an unbeaten record for any European monarch) in 1898, Wilhelm II wrote to Nicholas II that:

If I had come there without any religion at all, I certainly would have turned Mohammedan!

=== Antisemitism ===
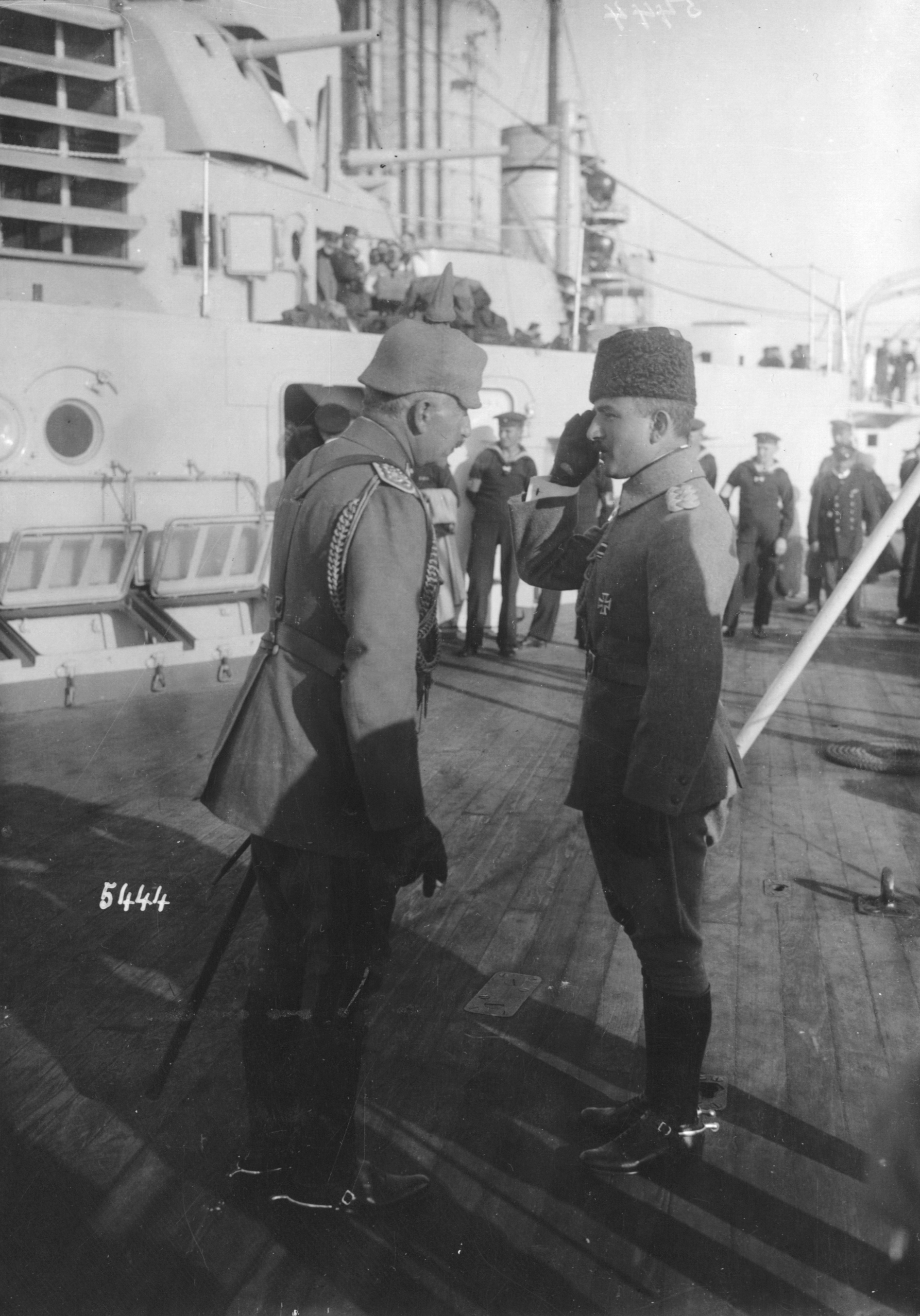
Kaiser Wilhelm II with Enver Pasha, October 1917. Staunchly pro-German, Enver was one of the main perpetrators of the Armenian genocide.

Wilhelm's biographer Lamar Cecil identified Wilhelm's "curious but well-developed anti-Semitism", noting that in 1888 a friend of Wilhelm "declared that the young Kaiser's dislike of his Hebrew subjects, one rooted in a perception that they possessed an overweening influence in Germany, was so strong that it could not be overcome".

Cecil concludes:

Wilhelm never changed, and throughout his life he believed that Jews were perversely responsible, largely through their prominence in the Berlin press and in leftist political movements, for encouraging opposition to his rule. For individual Jews, ranging from rich businessmen and major art collectors to purveyors of elegant goods in Berlin stores, he had considerable esteem, but he prevented Jewish citizens from having careers in the army and the diplomatic corps and frequently used abusive language against them.

At the height of German military intervention against the Red Army during the Russian Civil War in 1918, Kaiser Wilhelm also suggested a similar campaign against the "Jew-Bolsheviks" who were slaughtering the Baltic German nobility in the Baltic states, citing the example of what Turks had done to the Ottoman Armenians just a few years earlier.

On 2 December 1919, Wilhelm wrote to Mackensen, denouncing the November Revolution of 1918 and his own forced abdication as the "deepest, most disgusting shame ever perpetrated by a person in history, the Germans have done to themselves ... egged on and misled by the tribe of Judah ... Let no German ever forget this, nor rest until these parasites have been destroyed and exterminated from German soil!"

Wilhelm advocated a "regular international all-worlds pogrom à la Russe" as "the best cure" and further believed that Jews were a "nuisance that humanity must get rid of some way or other. I believe the best thing would be gas!"

== Ancestry ==
Ancestors of Wilhelm II

8. Frederick William III of Prussia
4. William I, German Emperor
9. Duchess Louise of Mecklenburg-Strelitz
2. Frederick III, German Emperor
10. Charles Frederick, Grand Duke of Saxe-Weimar-Eisenach
5. Princess Augusta of Saxe-Weimar-Eisenach
11. Grand Duchess Maria Pavlovna of Russia
1. Wilhelm II, German Emperor
12. Ernest I of Saxe-Coburg and Gotha
6. Prince Albert of Saxe-Coburg and Gotha
13. Princess Louise of Saxe-Gotha-Altenburg
3. Victoria, Princess Royal
14. Prince Edward, Duke of Kent and Strathearn
7. Queen Victoria of the United Kingdom
15. Princess Victoria of Saxe-Coburg-Saalfeld

== Documentaries and films ==
- William II. – The last days of the German Monarchy (original title: "Wilhelm II. – Die letzten Tage des Deutschen Kaiserreichs"), about the abdication and flight of the last German Kaiser. Germany/Belgium, 2007. Produced by seelmannfilm and German Television. Written and directed by Christoph Weinert.
- Queen Victoria and the Crippled Kaiser, Channel 4, Secret History series 13; first broadcast 17 November 2013
- Barry Foster played the adult Wilhelm II in several episodes of the 1974 BBC TV series Fall of Eagles.
- Christopher Neame played Wilhelm II in the several episodes of the 1975 BBC TV series Edward the Seventh.
- Rupert Julian played Wilhelm II in the 1918 Hollywood propaganda film The Kaiser, the Beast of Berlin.
- Alfred Struwe played Wilhelm in the 1987 Polish historical drama film Magnat.
- Robert Stadlober played a young crown prince Wilhelm and friend of Rudolf, Crown Prince of Austria in the acclaimed 2006 film Kronprinz Rudolf (The Crown Prince).
- Ladislav Frej played the Kaiser in the 2008 film The Red Baron.
- Rainer Sellien played Wilhelm II in the 2014 BBC miniseries 37 Days.
- Christopher Plummer played a depressed Wilhelm II living in exile at Huis Doorn in the 2016 romantic war drama The Exception.
- Sylvester Groth portrayed Wilhelm II during his last days as Emperor in the 2018 miniseries Kaisersturz ("The Emperor's Fall").
- Tom Hollander played Wilhelm II in the 2021 film The King's Man.

== Arms, orders and decorations ==
Lesser coat of arms of the German Emperor	Middle coat of arms of the German Emperor	Greater coat of arms of the German Emperor

Middle coat of arms of the King of Prussia	Greater coat of arms of the King of Prussia

German honours

- Prussia:
  - Knight of the Black Eagle, 27 January 1869; with Collar, 1877
  - Grand Cross of the Red Eagle, 27 January 1869
  - Knight of the Prussian Crown, 1st Class, 27 January 1869
  - Grand Commander's Cross of the Royal House Order of Hohenzollern, 27 January 1869
  - Founder of the Ladies Merit Cross, 25 April 1892
  - Founder of the Wilhelm-Orden, 18 January 1896
  - Founder of the Red Cross Medal, 1 October 1898
  - Founder of the Jerusalem Cross, 31 October 1898
  - Founder of the Order of Merit of the Prussian Crown, 18 January 1901
  - Iron Cross, 1st Class, 1914; Grand Cross, 11 December 1916
  - Pour le Mérite (military), 16 February 1915; with Oak Leaves, 12 May 1915
- Hohenzollern: Cross of Honour of the Princely House Order of Hohenzollern, 1st Class
- Anhalt:
  - Grand Cross of Albert the Bear, 1884
  - Friedrich Cross, 1914
- Baden:
  - Knight of the House Order of Fidelity, 1877
  - Knight of the Order of Berthold the First, 28 July 1877
  - Grand Cross of the Military Karl-Friedrich Merit Order, 1 November 1914
- Bavaria:
  - Knight of St. Hubert, 1881
  - Grand Cross of the Military Order of Max Joseph, 1 November 1914
- Brunswick:
  - Grand Cross of Henry the Lion, 1881
  - War Merit Cross, 1914
- (Saxe-Coburg and Gotha) (Duchy of Saxe-Altenburg) (Saxe-Meiningen) Ernestine duchies:
  - Grand Cross of the Saxe-Ernestine House Order, 1877
  - Cross for Merit in War (Meiningen), 15 October 1917
- (Bremen (state)) (Hamburg) Free Hanseatic Cities: Hanseatic Crosses, 15 October 1917
- (Grand Duchy of Hesse) Hesse and by Rhine:
  - Grand Cross of the Ludwig Order, 2 April 1872
  - Knight of the Golden Lion, with Collar, 19 April 1894
- Lippe: War Service Cross, 1st Class, 15 October 1917
- Mecklenburg:
  - Grand Cross of the Wendish Crown, with Crown in Ore
  - Military Merit Cross, 1st Class (Schwerin), 15 October 1917
- Oldenburg:
  - Grand Cross of the Order of Duke Peter Friedrich Ludwig, with Golden Crown and Collar, 18 February 1878
  - Friedrich August Cross, 15 October 1917
- Saxe-Weimar-Eisenach: Grand Cross of the White Falcon, 1877
- Saxony:
  - Knight of the Rue Crown, 28 July 1877
  - Grand Cross of the Military Order of St. Henry, 22 October 1914
- Schaumburg-Lippe: Service Cross, 1914
- Württemberg:
  - Grand Cross of the Württemberg Crown, 1877
  - Grand Cross of the Military Merit Order, 11 November 1914

Foreign honours

- (Austrian Empire) (Kingdom of Hungary) Austria-Hungary:
  - Grand Cross of the Royal Hungarian Order of St. Stephen, 1872
  - Grand Cross of the Military Order of Maria Theresa, 1914
- Belgium: Grand Cordon of the Order of Leopold (military), 9 October 1884
- Brazil: Grand Cross of the Southern Cross, 28 July 1877
- Bulgaria:
  - Grand Cross of St. Alexander, 28 July 1877
  - Knight of Saints Cyril and Methodius, with Collar, 1912
  - Grand Cross of the Military Merit Order, 18 January 1916
  - Order of Bravery, 1st Class, 11 October 1917
- Denmark:
  - Knight of the Elephant, 28 November 1879
  - Cross of Honour of the Order of the Dannebrog, 18 February 1906
- Finland: Grand Cross of the Cross of Liberty, with Swords and Diamonds, 30 June 1918
- Greece: Grand Cross of the Redeemer
- Hawaii: Grand Cross of the Order of Kamehameha I, 1881
- Italy:
  - Knight of the Annunciation, 24 September 1873
  - Knight Grand Cordon of Saints Maurice and Lazarus
  - Knight Grand Cross of the Military Order of Savoy, 8 September 1889
  - (Tuscany) Tuscan Grand Ducal Family: Knight Grand Cross of St. Joseph, 9 October 1884
- Sovereign Military Order of Malta: Bailiff Knight Grand Cross of Honour and Devotion of the Order of Saint John of Jerusalem
- Japan: Grand Cordon of the Order of the Chrysanthemum, 24 September 1886; Collar, 10 December 1894
- Montenegro: Grand Cross of the Order of Prince Danilo I, 28 July 1877
- Netherlands:
  - Knight Grand Cross of the Netherlands Lion, 28 July 1877
  - Knight Grand Cross of the Military William Order, 8 September 1889
  - Grand Cross of the House Order of Orange, 4 May 1905
- Norway:
  - Grand Cross with Collar of St. Olav 1 August 1888
  - Knight of the Norwegian Lion, 27 January 1904
- Ottoman Empire:
  - Order of the House of Osman, 30 November 1898
  - Order of Osmanieh, 1st Class in Diamonds
  - Order of Distinction
  - Order of Glory in Diamonds, 15 October 1917
  - War Service Medal, 15 October 1917
- Portugal:
  - Grand Cross of the Tower and Sword, 9 October 1884; with Collar, 1888
  - Grand Cross of the Sash of the Two Orders
- Russia:
  - Knight of St. Andrew, 1872
  - Knight of St. Alexander Nevsky, 1872
  - Knight of the White Eagle, 1872
  - Knight of St. Anna, 1st Class, 1872
  - Knight of St. Stanislaus, 1st Class, 1872
- Romania:
  - Grand Cross of the Star of Romania, 28 July 1877
  - Grand Cross of the Crown of Romania, 28 July 1877
  - Collar of the Order of Carol I, 1906
- San Marino: Grand Cross of San Marino, 9 October 1884
- Serbia:
  - Grand Cross of the Cross of Takovo, 28 July 1877
  - Grand Cross of the White Eagle
- (Thailand) Siam:
  - Grand Cross of the Crown of Siam, 28 July 1877
  - Knight of the Order of the Royal House of Chakri, 15 July 1891
- Spain: Knight of the Golden Fleece, 8 November 1875
- Sweden:
  - Knight of the Seraphim, 25 April 1878; with Collar, 1 November 1888
  - Commander Grand Cross of the Order of Vasa, with Collar, 30 July 1909
- United Kingdom:
  - Stranger Knight Companion of the Garter, 27 January 1877 (expelled in 1915)
  - Knight of Justice of St. John, 1888 (expelled in 1915)
  - Honorary Grand Cross of the Royal Victorian Order, 21 November 1899 (expelled in 1915)
  - Recipient of the Royal Victorian Chain, 9 November 1902 (expelled in 1915)
- Venezuela: Collar of the Order of the Liberator, 4 May 1905

== See also ==
- Ålesund, a Norwegian city rebuilt by Wilhelm II after it had been almost completely destroyed by fire in 1904
- German entry into World War I
- Family tree of German monarchs
- Wilhelminism on society, politics, culture, art and architecture of Germany 1890–1918
- Meteor III, the third Imperial German royal yacht of that name to be owned by Wilhelm II

== Notes ==
Wilhelm II House of Hohenzollern Born: 27 January 1859 Died: 4 June 1941
Regnal titles
Preceded by Frederick III	German Emperor; King of Prussia; 15 June 1888 – 9 November 1918	Vacant Monarchy abolished
Political offices
Preceded by Frederick III as German Emperor and King of Prussia	German head of state Prussian head of state 15 June 1888 – 9 November 1918	Succeeded by Friedrich Ebert as President of Germany and Prime Minister of Prussia
Titles in pretence
Loss of title Republic declared	— TITULAR — German Emperor; King of Prussia; 9 November 1918 – 4 June 1941; Reason for succession failure: German Revolution	Succeeded by Wilhelm, German Crown Prince
