= Ivan Sergeevich Artsishevsky =

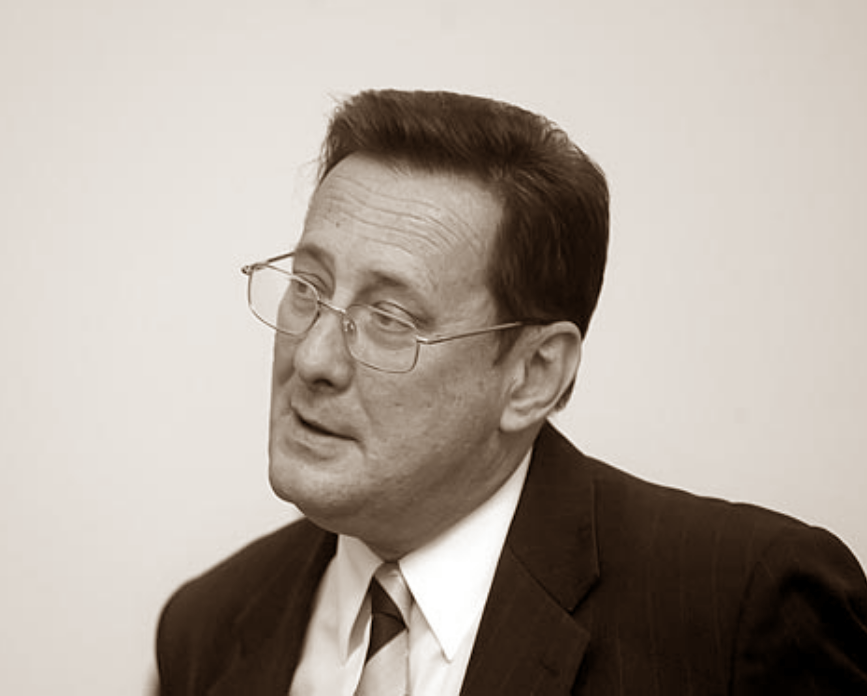
- Born: June 17, 1950; China
- Died: April 7, 2021 (aged 70); St. Petersburg
- Citizenship: Russia
- Occupations: Leading specialist in the field of etiquette and protocol in Russia
- Years active: 1998-2017
- Organization: Unification of the Romanov family
- Known for: Representative of the House of Romanov
- Website: https://etiket.spb.ru/

Ivan Sergeevich Artsishevsky (Polish: Iwan Siergiejewicz Artiszewski; June 17, 1950 — April 7, 2021) was the representative of the Association of Members of the Romanov Family in Russia, and a leading expert in the field of etiquette and protocol in Russia. He was a member of the "Union of Russian Nobles" in Paris, member of the International Club of St. Petersburgers, and a member of the Public Council of the Tax Service Administration for Saint Petersburg.

== Biography ==
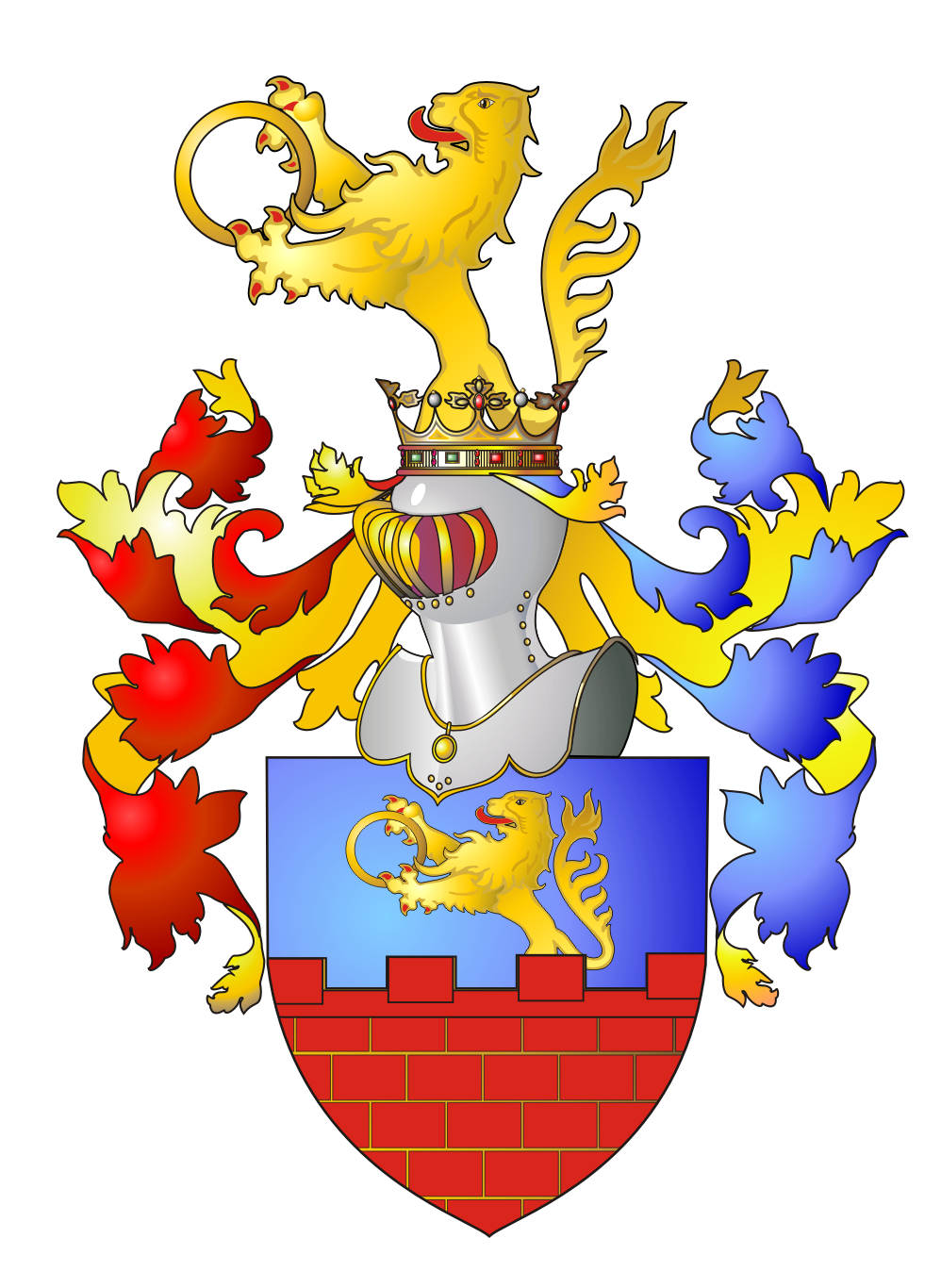
Artiszewski coat of arms (Pravdzic)

Ivan Sergeevich Artsishevsky was born on June 17, 1950, in China to a family of Russian emigrants. (Note: Ivan Artsishevsky about himself: I was born in China to a family of Russian emigrants of the so-called "first wave". The biographies of my parents could form the basis for a fascinating novel: my mother, Nina Valentinovna, was born in Japan, where the family of her father, an officer of the White Guard, moved. It is known that the retreating General O. V. Kappel, who led the White movement in the Far East, died in the arms of my grandfather, my mother's father. My father, Sergei Antonovich Artsishevsky, was born in Harbin, back in 1922, into a family of participants in the construction of the Chinese Eastern Railway (CER).) In 1953, the Artsishevskys moved to Brazil, to São Paulo. At the age of 7, Ivan went to a Brazilian school. He returned to his homeland with his family in 1967. He graduated from the P. Stuchka Latvian State University with a degree in mathematics. He worked in the Leningrad branch of the State Committee for Tourism as the head of the information group and as the head of the additional services group. In 1991, Ivan Sergeevich held the first Congress of Compatriots in Leningrad. In 1994 he became General Director of the 3rd meeting of the Board of Directors of the European Bank for Reconstruction and Development. Artsishevsky was married and had a daughter.

== Association of Members of the Romanov Family ==
He began his activities as a representative of the Association of the Romanov Family under the mayor of Saint Petersburg Anatoly Sobchak, when he organized the first visit of the descendants of the imperial family to Russia. In 1998, he headed the working group for the reburial of Emperor Nicholas II, his family and servants, and wrote the burial scenario. At the same time, he became the representative of the Romanov family in Russia, which he remained until 2017. At the same time, he was appointed to the post of head of the State Protocol Department of the Administration of Saint Petersburg, where he was responsible for organizing and holding numerous visits of heads of state and government to our city. In 2006, Ivan Sergeevich left Smolny and organized the "School of Protocol and Etiquette", the first licensed institution of this profile. Over time, the School was transformed into the Etiquette Center "European Format", and then into the "Ivan Artsishevsky Center for Effective Communications", reflecting the ever-growing interest in the topic of communication culture and business communications. He has participated in numerous radio and television programs and is the author of several books on etiquette, including for children. He has lectured at Saint Petersburg State University, the Academy of Public Administration under the President of the Russian Federation, the Stockholm School of Economics, and a number of other educational institutions. (Note: Ivan Artsishevsky about himself: All over the world, the owner of the establishment - the owner - tries to teach the waiter so that he perceives the person coming to the restaurant as a guest. Accordingly, the waiter rejoices, tries to help him in every possible way and feed him delicious food. We still often have a different attitude: they say, I work, and you walk around here!.. Unfortunately, this is the legacy of the Soviet system, which still remains in very many - I don’t want to say that in all, but in very many - waiters. They begin to either serve or become arrogant. Both are sides of the same coin - an inferiority complex. You need to get rid of it!) The Kirillovichs' claims to the throne were criticized by the Association of Members of the Romanov Family. According to some information, he himself collaborated with the Russian Imperial Fund Grand Duke Georgy Romanov on a number of issues.

== Last years and death ==
In 2017, the "Association of Members of the Romanov Family" held presidential elections. After the death of the last active member Dmitry Romanovich, the organization's official representative in Russia, Ivan Artsishevsky, managed its affairs. Prince Mikhail Pavlovich Romanovsky-Ilyinsky (Note: His Excellency Prince Mikhail Pavlovich Romanovsky-Ilyinsky, president of the "Association of Members of the Romanov Family" from August 1 to December 3, 2017, grandson of Grand Duke Dmitry Pavlovich and vice-president of the Association of Members of the Romanov Family since 2011.) fired Artsishevsky and announced to the press his election as the new president. And he appointed Pavel Kulikovsky as the representative of the Association instead of Artsishevsky. (Note: Ivan Artsishevsky about himself: I fully admit that Pavel Eduardovich was used in the dark. He himself is quite active in maintaining interest in the history of the Romanovs. But he is not a pushy one. On July 17, 1998, I helped him get to the ceremony of reburial of the royal remains: he could not explain to the blockhead policemen that he was not a gawker like me, but the great-grandson of Nicholas II's sister. A quarter of a century has passed, how old I am...) Artsishevsky had been seriously ill for the last two years, and had undergone more than one operation. Ivan Sergeevich died on April 7, 2021, at the Pesochny Cancer Center, after a long illness, he did not live several months to see the wedding of Grand Duke Georgy Mikhailovich and Rebecca Bettarini in 2021. Governor Alexander Beglov sent condolences on the occasion of his death. The farewell to I. S. Artsishevsky took place in the Prince Vladimir Cathedral. The exact place where I.S. Artsishevsky is buried is unknown.
