= Princess Henriette of Schönaich-Carolath =

German princess (1918–1972)

Princess Henriette
- Princess Karl Franz of Prussia
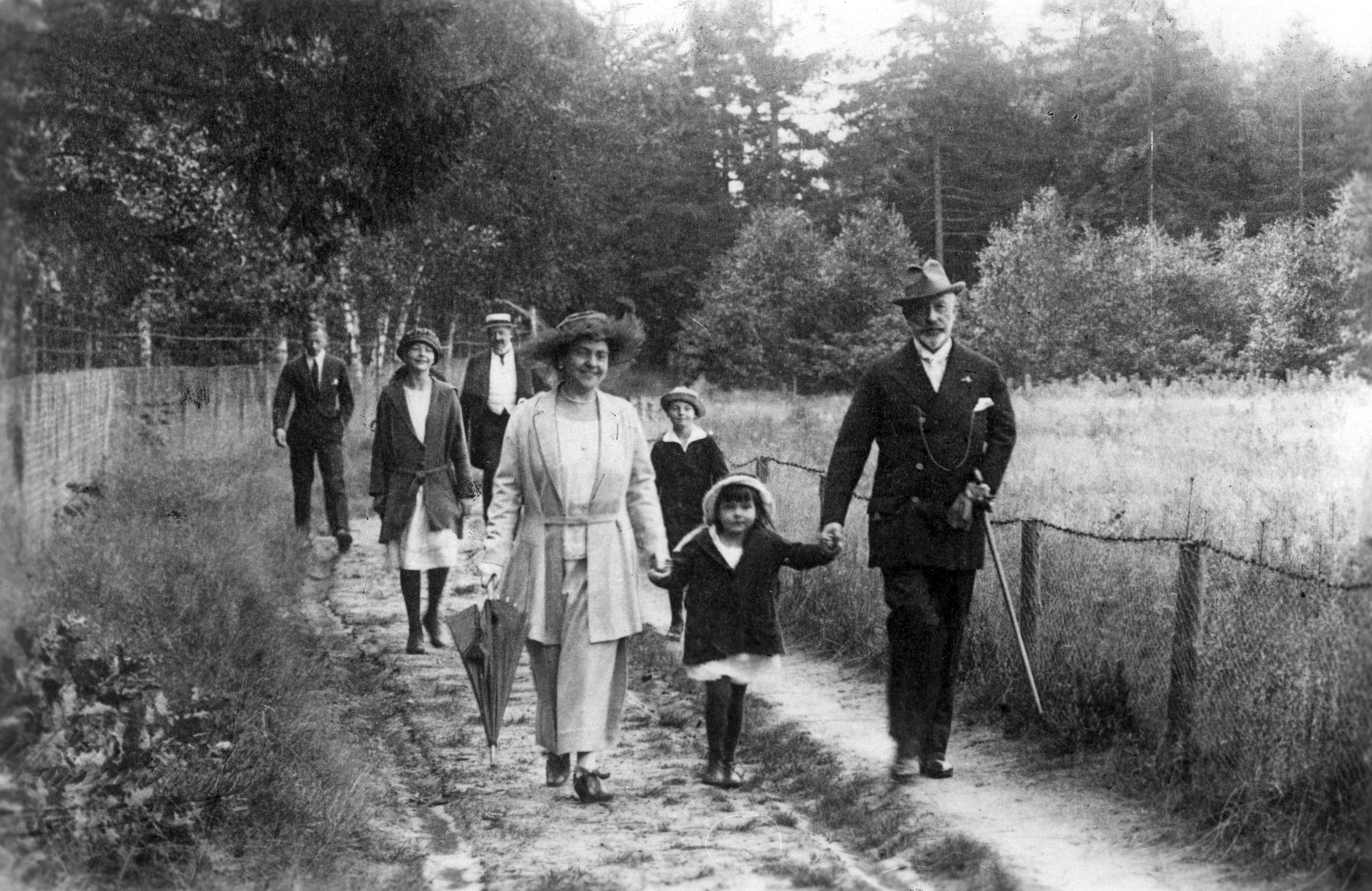
- Henriette in 1927 with her mother and stepfather
- Born: 25 November 1918; Berlin, Weimar Republic
- Died: 16 March 1972 (aged 53); Neuendettelsau, West Germany
- Spouse: Prince Karl Franz of Prussia (m. 1940; div. 1946)
- Issue: Prince Franz Wilhelm; Prince Friedrich Christian; Prince Franz Friedrich
Names
- German: Henriette Hermine Wanda Ida Luise
- House: Schönaich-Carolath
- Father: Prince Johann George of Schönaich-Carolath
- Mother: Princess Hermine Reuss of Greiz

Princess Henriette of Schönaich-Carolath (German: Henriette Hermine Wanda Ida Luise Prinzessin von Schönaich-Carolath, pronounced [hɛnʁiˈɛtə fɔn ˈʃøːnaɪç ˈkaːʁolat]; 25 November 1918 – 16 March 1972) was the youngest daughter of Prince Johann George von Schönaich-Carolath and Princess Hermine Reuss of Greiz, who later became the second wife of Wilhelm II, German Emperor.

== Early life ==
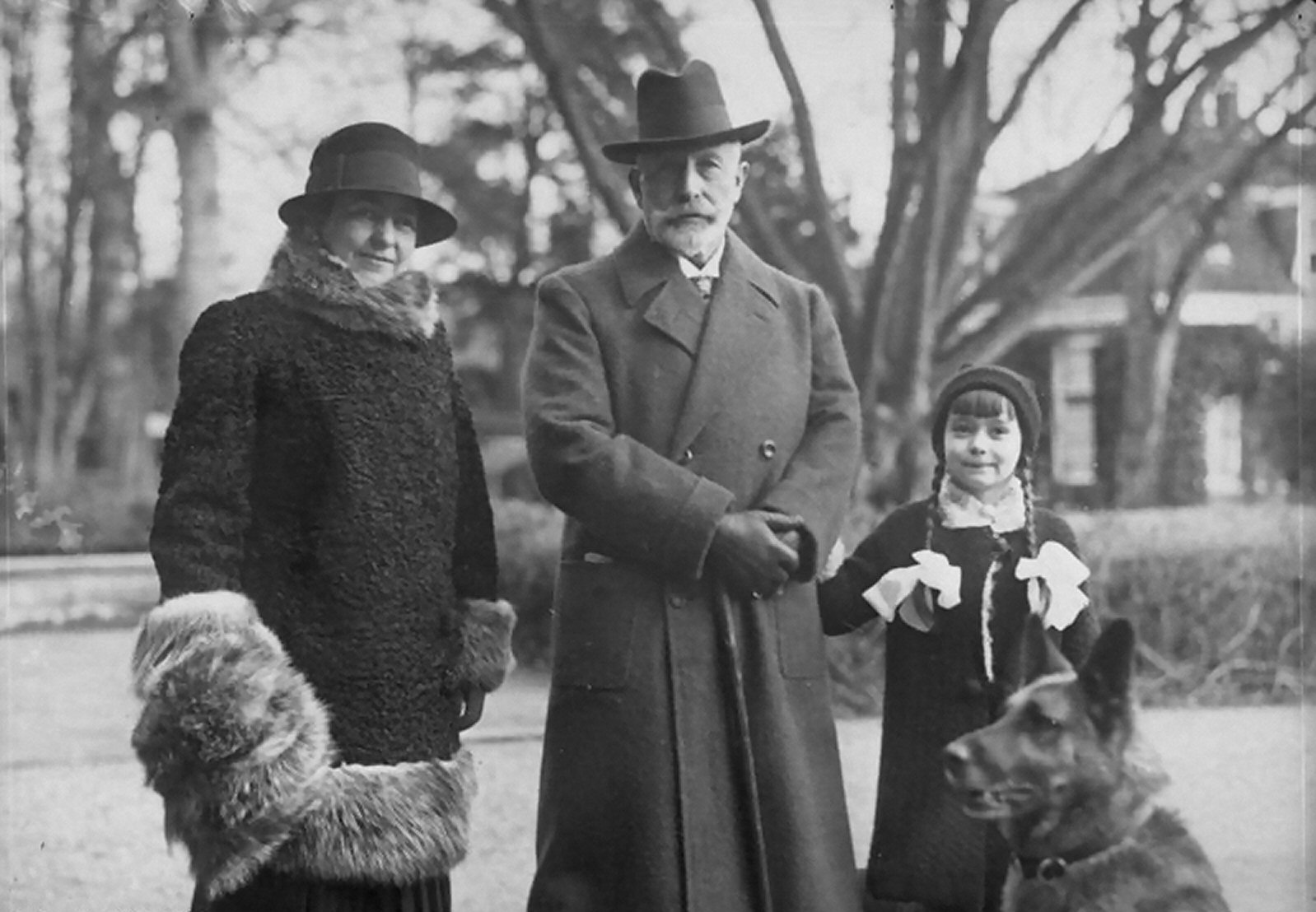
Princess Henriette, her mother Hermine, and her stepfather Kaiser Wilhelm II, in March 1931

Princess Henriette was born at Berlin, Weimar Republic, as the fifth child and youngest daughter of Prince Johann George of Schönaich-Carolath (son of Prince George of Schönaich-Carolath and Princess Wanda of Schönaich-Carolath) and his wife, Princess Hermine Reuss of Greiz, daughter of Heinrich XXII, Prince Reuss of Greiz and Princess Ida of Schaumburg-Lippe.

After Princess Henriette's father died in 1920, her mother married secondly in 1922 to the former German Emperor, Wilhelm II. Hermine had five young children, but it was decided that only the youngest, Princess Henriette, would come to live with them at Doorn.

Wilhelm generally stayed out of his stepchildren's affairs, with the exception of Henriette. He seemed to have a genuine affection for her, and she came to be known as "the general". According to Giles MacDonough, Henriette "performed the role of resident grandchild, passing the sugar when coffee was served".

== Marriage ==
On 6 August 1940 at his residence at Doorn, former German Emperor Wilhelm II officially announced his stepdaughter Princess Henriette's engagement with his grandson, Prince Karl Franz of Prussia. Karl Franz (1916–1975) was the only son of Prince Joachim of Prussia and his wife, Princess Marie-Auguste of Anhalt.

The couple were married on 1 October 1940 and had three sons:

- Prince Franz Wilhelm of Prussia (born 3 September 1943), married in 1976 to Maria Vladimirovna, Grand Duchess of Russia, claimant to the Headship of the Imperial Family of Russia; they divorced in 1985 and had one son, George Mikhailovich Romanov. He married secondly in 2019 to Nadia Nour El Etreby (born 2 August 1949).
- Prince Friedrich Christian of Prussia (3 September 1943 – 26 September 1943)
- Prince Franz-Friedrich of Prussia (born 17 October 1944), married firstly in 1970 in a morganatic marriage to Gudrun Edith Winkler (born 29 January 1949), divorced in 1996, and had one daughter, Christine Prinzessin von Preußen (born 22 February 1968). He married secondly in 1998 to Potsdam politician and former pianist Susann Genske (born 12 January 1964), with no issue.

The couple divorced on 5 September 1946. Henriette died on 16 March 1972 at age 53 at Neuendettelsau, West Germany.

== Ancestry ==
Ancestors of Princess Henriette of Schönaich-Carolath

8. Prince Ferdinand of Schönaich-Carolath
4. Prince George of Schönaich-Carolath
9. Princess Johanna Reuss of Köstritz
2. Prince Johann George of Schönaich-Carolath
10. Prince Ludwig of Schönaich-Carolath
5. Princess Wanda of Schönaich-Carolath
11. Countess Wanda Henckel von Donnersmarck
1. Princess Henriette of Schönaich-Carolath
12. Heinrich XX, Prince Reuss of Greiz
6. Heinrich XXII, Prince Reuss of Greiz
13. Princess Caroline of Hesse-Homburg
3. Princess Hermine Reuss of Greiz
14. Adolf I, Prince of Schaumburg-Lippe
7. Princess Ida of Schaumburg-Lippe
15. Princess Hermine of Waldeck and Pyrmont

== Sources ==
- MacDonogh, Giles (2000). The Last Kaiser: The Life of Wilhelm II. New York: St. Martin's Press. ISBN 0-312-30557-5.
