= Wedding of Grand Duke George Mikhailovich and Rebecca Virginia Bettarini =

2021 royal wedding

- Date: 1 October 2021
- Venue: Saint Isaac's Cathedral
- Location: Saint Petersburg, Russia
- Participants: Grand Duke George Mikhailovich of Russia; Rebecca Virginia Bettarini

The wedding of Grand Duke George Mikhailovich of Russia and Rebecca Virginia Bettarini took place on 1 October 2021 at Saint Isaac's Cathedral in Saint Petersburg. It was reported as the first royal wedding to take place in Russia since the Russian Revolution. The groom is the son and heir of Grand Duchess Maria Vladimirovna of Russia, the disputed head of the House of Romanov. The bride, who converted to the Russian Orthodox faith from Catholicism and took the name Victoria Romanovna, is the daughter of the former Italian Ambassador to Belgium, Roberto Bettarini.

== Background and engagement ==
Grand Duke George Mikhailovich of Russia is the son and heir of Grand Duchess Maria Vladimirovna of Russia, the disputed head of the House of Romanov, and Prince Franz Wilhelm of Prussia. He is the great-grandson of Grand Duke Kirill Vladimirovich of Russia and a third-great-grandson of Alexander II of Russia.

Rebecca Virginia Bettarini is the daughter of the Italian diplomat Roberto Bettarini, who served as the Italian Ambassador to Belgium, and Carla Virginia Cacciatore.

Grand Duke George met Bettarini while working for the European Parliament in Brussels. They moved to Russia in 2019.

Bettarini's engagement ring featured a centered ruby cabochon gemstone and two diamonds.

Bettarini converted from Roman Catholicism to Russian Orthodoxy for the wedding, adopting the name Victoria Romanovna.

== Celebrations and events ==
The wedding occurred despite the COVID-19 pandemic in Russia. The Russian Ministry of Foreign Affairs assisted with obtaining travel visas for guests and the Russian Ministry of Culture assisted in obtaining locations for the wedding ceremony and festivities.

The couple were first married in a civil ceremony on 24 September in Moscow.

Saint Petersburg was picked as the location for the religious wedding and following celebrations because it was the first place in Russia where the Romanov family returned following the collapse of the Soviet Union.

== Wedding service ==
The Russian Orthodox ceremony took place on 1 October 2021 at Saint Isaac's Cathedral in Saint Petersburg. The bride was attended by a group of young bridesmaids, who carried her twenty-three foot long train. She was walked down the aisle by her father. Her wedding dress featured the coat of arms of the Russian Empire, embroidered in gold. Her wedding dress, a white satin gown, was reportedly designed by Reem Acra. Bettarini wore the Lacis tiara, a 27.03 carat diamond tiara by French jeweler Chaumet, and a veil with an Imperial Eagle embroidered on it. The tiara featured two central diamonds of 5.02 and 2.21 carats and four hundred and thirty eight pavé diamonds. The couple's wedding rings were designed by the House of Fabergé.

The couple were attended by a ceremonial honor guard. The ceremony was blessed by Metropolitan Varsonofy Sudakov, the top official of the Russian Orthodox Church in Saint Petersburg.

Bettarini, now Victoria Romanovna, was bestowed the title of princess with the style Her Serene Highness by Grand Duchess Maria, although this title is not recognized by the Russian government.

== Reception ==
The wedding ceremony lasted approximately two hours, with only a third of the guests invited for reception at the Russian Ethnographic Museum, symbolically founded by Nicholas II.

Bettarini changed for the reception, into an embroidered white ballgown with puff-sleeeved jacket. Sicilian wine and food provided by catering magnate Yevgeny Prigozhin was served at the reception.

A wedding breakfast, served "à la Russe", followed at the Konstantinovsky Palace, attended by 700 guests. The brunch included live performances and an auction. That evening, guests attended a concert in honor of the opening of the Russian Imperial Music Society.

== Guests ==
The wedding was attended by approximately 1,500 guests. Many guests were members of Russian, Spanish and other European nobility.

=== Groom's family ===
- Grand Duchess Maria Vladimirovna of Russia, the groom's mother
- Prince and Princess Franz Wilhelm of Prussia, the groom's father and stepmother
- Princess Désirée of Prussia, the groom's paternal aunt
- Helen Louise Kirby, Countess Dvinskaya, the groom's maternal aunt

=== Bride's family ===
- Roberto Bettarini, the bride's father
- Carla Virginia Cacciatore, the bride's mother

=== Foreign royalty ===
==== Reigning royalty ====
- Queen Sofía of Spain
- Prince Mohammed bin Hamad of Qatar
- Princess Léa of Belgium
- Princess Isabelle of Liechtenstein
  - Prince Rudolf and Princess Tılsım of Liechtenstein
  - Prince Wenzeslaus of Liechtenstein

==== Non-reigning royalty ====
- Tsar Simeon II and Tsaritsa Margarita of Bulgaria
  - The Prince of Tarnovo
- King Fuad II of Egypt
  - The Prince and Princess of the Sa'id
- Archduke Maximilian of Austria
- The Duke and Duchess of Braganza
  - The Prince of Beira
- The Prince and Princess of Albania
- The Duke and Duchess of Anjou
- Prince Charles-Philippe d'Orléans
- The Prince and Princess of Pontecorvo
- The Prince of Venice
- The Duke and Duchess of Aosta
- Prince David Bagration of Mukhrani
- Prince Irakli Bagration of Mukhrani
- Prince Charles-Henri de Lobkowicz

=== Politicians and government officials ===
- Xavier Bettel, Prime Minister of Luxembourg and his husband, Gauthier Destenay
- (Russia) Maria Zakharova

=== Other notable guests ===
- Konstantin Malofeev, Russian businessman and monarchist
- Aleksandr Dugin, Russian far-right political philosopher
- Elizaveta Peskova, daughter of Dmitri Peskov
- Sarah Fabergé, Director of Special Projects for the House of Fabergé
- Russell E. Martin, academic

== Reactions and aftermath ==
The wedding was reported as the first royal wedding to take place in Russia in over a century, following the wedding of Prince Andrei Alexandrovich of Russia to Elisabetta di Sasso Ruffo in 1918. However, the wedding of Prince Dimitri Romanov and Countess Dorrit Reventlow took place in Kostroma on 28 July 1993.

Conservative political philosopher Aleksandr Dugin said the event was "a kind of imperial wedding. A remembrance of eternal Russia – of sacred czars and patriarchs and the church."

Vladimir Putin did not acknowledge the wedding. His spokesman, Dmitry Peskov, confirmed that no congratulations was sent to the couple from the Russian government. Peskov stated that, "Putin doesn't plan to congratulate the newlyweds, this wedding has nothing to do with our agenda. In Moscow and St. Petersburg and other cities across Russia, there are weddings every day. We're happy for all our newleyweds."

Sergei Shoigu, the Russian Minister of Defence, brought officials to disciplinary liability representatives of the Western Military District for sending military personnel to the wedding ceremony An official investigation was conducted, which found certain officials violated the requirements of their governing documents which state that military personnel not be involved in the honor guard company for events that are not regulated by the Ministry of Defense.
