= Grand Duke Michael =

Grand Duke Michael may refer to:

- Grand Duke Michael Alexandrovich of Russia (1878–1918), youngest son of Tsar Alexander III of Russia
- Grand Duke Michael Mikhailovich of Russia (1861–1929), second son of Grand Duke Michael Nikolaievich of Russia
- Grand Duke Michael Nikolaevich of Russia (1832–1909), fourth son of Tsar Nicholas I of Russia
- Grand Duke Michael Pavlovich of Russia (1798–1849), fourth son of Tsar Paul I of Russia
- Franz Wilhelm Prinz von Preussen (born 1943), German businessman who due to marriage was styled Grand Duke Mikhail Pavlovich of Russia from 1976 to 1986
