= Princess Caroline Reuss of Greiz =

German princess (1884–1905)

Princess Caroline
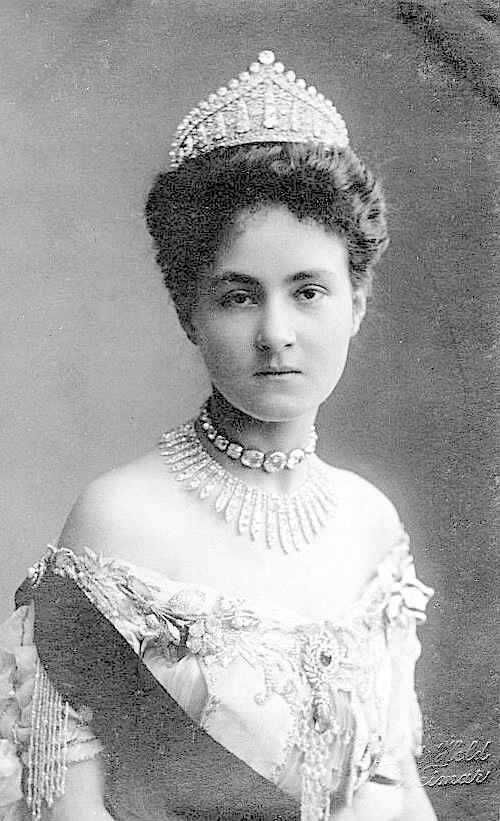
- 1904 photograph

Grand Duchess consort of Saxe-Weimar-Eisenach
- Tenure: 30 April 1903 – 17 January 1905
- Born: 13 July 1884; Greiz
- Died: 17 January 1905 (aged 20); Meiningen
- Burial: Weimarer Fürstengruft
- Spouse: Wilhelm Ernst, Grand Duke of Saxe-Weimar-Eisenach (m. 1903)
Names
- Caroline Elisabeth Ida Reuß zu Greiz
- House: Reuss Elder Line
- Father: Heinrich XXII, Prince Reuss of Greiz
- Mother: Princess Ida of Schaumburg-Lippe

Princess Caroline Elizabeth Ida Reuss of Greiz (13 July 1884 – 17 January 1905) was the first wife of Wilhelm Ernst, Grand Duke of Saxe-Weimar-Eisenach.

== Biography ==
=== Early life ===
Caroline was a daughter of Heinrich XXII, the reigning Prince Reuss of Greiz by his wife Princess Ida, daughter of Adolf I, Prince of Schaumburg-Lippe and Princess Hermine of Waldeck and Pyrmont, aunt of Queen Emma of the Netherlands. Her mother died in 1891, and her father died in 1902. She had only one surviving brother, Prince Heinrich XXIV Reuss of Greiz, who was incapable of governing because of the physical and mental ailments that resulted from a childhood accident. Power passed to their cousin Heinrich XIV, Prince Reuss Younger Line as a result once their father died. Her younger sister Princess Hermine Reuss of Greiz would later marry Emperor Wilhelm II as his second wife.

=== Marriage ===
The betrothal of Princess Caroline and Wilhelm Ernst, the reigning Grand Duke of Saxe-Weimar-Eisenach since 1901, was announced on 10 December 1902. At Buckeburg Castle (the home of her uncle), they married on 30 April 1903. Caroline was reportedly very against the match; at the last second of the wedding, she attempted to draw back, only to be persuaded most forcibly by Emperor Wilhelm II and Empress Augusta Viktoria to proceed with the marriage. Caroline wore a dress of white satin trimmed with lace; her cousins Prince George of Schaumburg-Lippe and Prince Heinrich XIV of Reuss zu Schleiz, as well as William Ernest's mother Dowager Hereditary Grand Duchess Pauline attended the wedding. His cousin Queen Wilhelmina and her consort Prince Hendrik also came to the wedding.

=== Life at the Weimar court ===
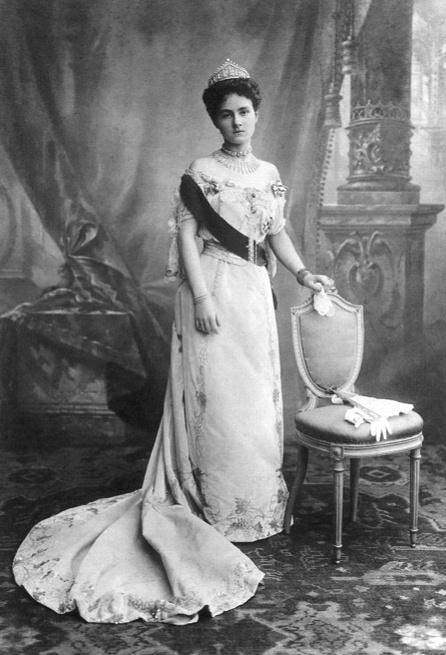
Caroline Reuss of Greiz in an official court dress

The marriage was unhappy, as Caroline found the rigid Weimar court etiquette intolerable. The court was generally considered to be one of the most stifling and etiquette-driven in Germany. One source recounted:

"It envelops royalty there in a species of captivity, and while the grand duke lends thereto and is too conservative to admit of any change, it crushes with its trammels the more spirited members of the family".

Her husband was described as:

One of the wealthiest sovereigns in Europe; stolid, well-behaved, imbued with great pride of race, and a strict sense of what is due to the anointed of the Lord. He is also one of the most severely respected and proper of German rulers...the Grand Duke is very dull, and his court and environment reflect his character in this respect to such a point that Weimar has become the dreariest capital in Europe.

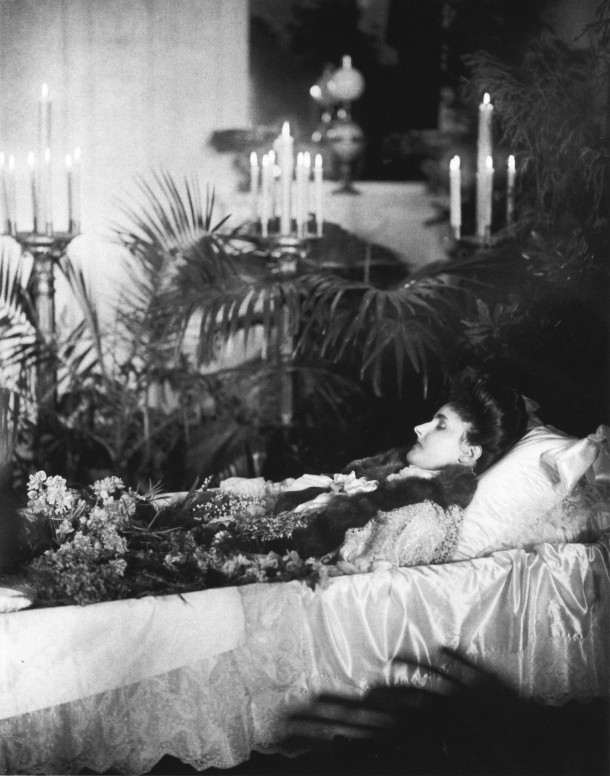
Grand Duchess Caroline's remains lying in state, 1905.

Caroline caused a scandal by seeking refuge in Switzerland; her husband followed soon after, as it was made understood that she had not fled the marriage but instead had simply sought to be away from her entourage in Weimar. She was eventually induced to return, but soon lost health and lapsed into melancholia. She died eighteen months after their marriage, on 17 January 1905, under mysterious circumstances. The official cause of death was pneumonia following influenza; other sources however have suggested suicide. The couple had no children together. She was the last member of the House of Saxe-Weimar to be buried in the Weimarer Fürstengruft, the royal family's crypt. William Ernest later remarried to Princess Feodora of Saxe-Meiningen.

== Honours ==
- Saxe-Weimar-Eisenach: Dame Grand Cross of the White Falcon, in Diamonds
- Kingdom of Prussia: Dame of the Order of Louise, 1st Class

== Ancestry ==
Ancestors of Princess Caroline Reuss of Greiz

8. Heinrich XIII, Prince Reuss of Greiz
4. Heinrich XX, Prince Reuss of Greiz
9. Princess Louise of Nassau-Weilburg
2. Heinrich XXII, Prince Reuss of Greiz
10. Gustav, Landgrave of Hesse-Homburg
5. Princess Caroline of Hesse-Homburg
11. Princess Louise Friederike of Anhalt-Dessau
1. Princess Caroline Reuss of Greiz
12. George William, Prince of Schaumburg-Lippe
6. Adolf I, Prince of Schaumburg-Lippe
13. Princess Ida of Waldeck and Pyrmont
3. Princess Ida of Schaumburg-Lippe
14. George II, Prince of Waldeck and Pyrmont
7. Princess Hermine of Waldeck and Pyrmont
15. Princess Emma of Anhalt-Bernburg-Schaumburg-Hoym

Princess Caroline Reuss of Greiz House of Reuss Born: 13 July 1884 Died: 17 January 1905
German royalty
Preceded by Sophie of the Netherlands	Grand Duchess consort of Saxe-Weimar-Eisenach; 30 April 1903 – 17 January 1905	Succeeded by Feodora of Saxe-Meiningen
