= Grand Duke George Mikhailovich of Russia =

Prince of Prussia and Tsesarevich of Russia

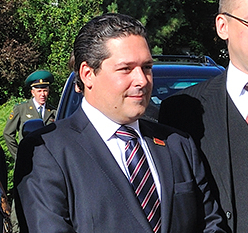
- Grand Duke Georgy Mikhailovich in Transnistria in 2010
- Born: 13 March 1981 (age 45); Madrid, Spain
- Spouse: Rebecca Virginia Bettarini (m. 2021)
- Issue: Prince Alexander Georgievich Romanov; Princess Kira Leonida Georgievna Romanova
Names
- George Mikhailovich Romanov
- House: Romanov (enatic); Hohenzollern (agnatic)
- Father: Prince Franz Wilhelm of Prussia
- Mother: Grand Duchess Maria Vladimirovna of Russia
- Religion: Russian Orthodox

Grand Duke George Mikhailovich of Russia (Russian: Георгий Михайлович Романов, romanized: Georgij Mihajlovič Romanov, also spelled Romanoff; German: Georg Michailowitsch Romanow; born 13 March 1981) is the heir apparent to Maria Vladimirovna, a claimant to the disputed headship of the imperial family of Russia. He is the only child of Maria and her former husband, Prince Franz Wilhelm of Prussia. George's mother attributes to him the title of Tsesarevich and he bears the prefix of "Grand Duke" with the style of Imperial Highness, which is still being questioned. As the son of a cadet member of the branch of the House of Hohenzollern which formerly ruled the German Empire and Kingdom of Prussia, he is also sometimes entitled "Prince of Prussia" with the style of Royal Highness.

== Early life ==
George was born in Madrid in 1981, the son of Grand Duchess Maria Vladimirovna of Russia (daughter and heir of Vladimir Cyrillovich, Grand Duke of Russia) and Prince Franz Wilhelm of Prussia (titled at the time Grand Duke Michael Pavlovich, son of Prince Karl Franz of Prussia and Princess Henriette of Schönaich-Carolath).

George was baptised on 6 May 1981, in Madrid; his godfather is Constantine II of Greece. Also present at the baptism were King Juan Carlos and Queen Sofía of Spain and Simeon II and Queen Margarita of Bulgaria. The announcement that George Mikhailovich would be known as a Russian grand duke prompted Prince Vasili Alexandrovich, then president of the Romanov Family Association, to respond in writing that "The Romanov Family Association hereby declares that the joyful event in the Prussian Royal House does not concern the Romanov Family Association since the newborn prince is not a member of either the Russian Imperial House or of the Romanov family". This response was ignored by Grand Duke Vladimir as he had already selected his daughter to succeed him according to the Pauline laws, and because the marriage between her and Prince Franz Wilhelm of Prussia was deemed dynastic. Prior to their wedding, the grand duke and his first cousin, then head of the house of Hohenzollern, Prince Louis Ferdinand of Prussia, had made a dynastic agreement that any child born from this marriage should be raised as a Romanov. Therefore, George is considered a dynast of both houses (Romanov and Hohenzollern), as his father has never renounced his Prussian royal title.

His father, who stopped using his Russian title after his separation, has said of his son, "I have his German passport right here; I always carry it with me. It says he is Prince George of Prussia".

George spent the first years of his life in France before moving to Spain. There he and his mother lived, along with his maternal grandmother, in the home of his maternal aunt, Helen Kirby, who inherited a significant fortune from her father, Sumner Moore Kirby.

== Education and career ==
George was educated at International School of Madrid and Runnymede College in Madrid, D'Overbroeck's College, Oxford and at St Benet's Hall, Oxford.

In Brussels, he worked at the European Parliament where he was an assistant to Loyola de Palacio, former European Commissioner for Transport and Energy. Later he moved to Luxembourg where he was employed at the European Commission's Directorate-General for Atomic Energy and Security.

On 12 December 2008, he was appointed an aide to the Director General of MMC Norilsk Nickel, a major Russian nickel-mining company. In 2012 he was nominated chief executive of Metal Trade Overseas, the main sales hub for Norilsk Nickel in Switzerland. In 2014 he started his own company, Romanoff & Partners, in Brussels.

== Heir to his mother ==
On 21 April 1992, upon the death of his maternal grandfather Grand Duke Vladimir Cyrillovich, George's mother claimed to have succeeded as the sovereign and Curatrix of the Throne of Russia, making him, to supporters of his mother, heir apparent and tsesarevich. He visited Russia for the first time shortly thereafter to attend the funeral of his grandfather. His claim to the throne is contested.

In 1996, when he, his mother, and his grandmother Leonida returned to Russia after living in Madrid, one of President Boris Yeltsin's former bodyguards was assigned as tutor to the 15-year-old prince. He was also set to study at a Russian Naval college but these plans were dropped.

On 17 July 2018 he participated, along with his mother, in the liturgical commemoration of the centenary of the assassinations of Saints Nicholas II, Empress Alexandra Feodorovna and their children conducted in Yekaterinburg by Patriarch Kirill I of Moscow.

== Marriage and children ==
In January 2021, the family announced that George was engaged to marry Victoria Romanovna Bettarini (born Rebecca Virginia Bettarini in Rome on 18 May 1982), having received the permission of Grand Duchess Maria. His mother decreed that Bettarini would have the title of Princess, with the predicate "Her Serene Highness" and the right to use the surname Romanova from her marriage, which therefore implies that theirs is a morganatic union. Victoria Bettarini is the Director of the Russian Imperial Foundation. She is the daughter of Roberto Amedeo Simeone Bettarini (born in Taranto on 5 May 1947), an Italian diplomat, ambassador in Luxembourg from 2006 to 2010 and in Brussels from 2010 and 2013, and wife Carla Virginia Cacciatore (born in Rome, Italy, on 30 April 1945), whom he married in Kinshasa, Zaire, on 13 August 1977.

They married on 24 September 2021 in a civil ceremony in Moscow. The religious wedding took place on 1 October in Saint Petersburg, at Saint Isaac's Cathedral. Around 1,500 guests attended the ceremony, including King Simeon II of Bulgaria and his wife Queen Margarita, King Fuad II of Egypt, Prince Mohammed bin Hamad of Qatar, Duarte Pio, Duke of Braganza and his wife Isabel, Duchess of Braganza, Prince Emanuele Filiberto, Prince of Piedmont, Leka, Prince of Albania and his wife Crown Princess Elia, Xavier Bettel, Prime Minister of Luxembourg and his husband Gauthier Destenay, Prince Louis, Duke of Anjou and his wife Princess Marie Marguerite, Duchess of Anjou, Prince Aimone, 6th Duke of Aosta and his wife, born Princess Olga of Greece, Russian monarchist and billionaire Konstantin Malofeev, Sarah Fabergé, French journalist and socialite Stéphane Bern, and many members of Russian, Spanish and European nobility.

Following the wedding events, a gala wedding supper was held at the Russian Museum of Ethnography in St. Petersburg. The 500 guests included members of the royal houses of Albania, Afghanistan, Austria, Belgium, Bulgaria, Egypt, France, Greece, Italy, Liechtenstein, Portugal, Prussia, Qatar, and Spain. The following day, a Wedding breakfast "à la Russe" was hosted by George's mother, the Grand Duchess Maria, held at Constantine Palace and was attended by a smaller number of 700 guests before their departures.

=== Children ===
The Grand Duke and Princess Victoria had a son, born in Moscow on 21 October 2022, who is named Alexander Georgievich Romanov. Grand Duchess Maria Vladimirovna, a claimant to the throne of the Imperial House of Russia, announced that her first grandchild would be called "His Serene Highness Prince Alexander Georgievich Romanov".

Prince Alexander was baptized on 6 December 2022. Prince Alexander's godparents are:

- Prince Joachim Murat, Prince of Pontecorvo;
- Prince Stephane Belosselsky-Belozersky;
- Prince Mikhail Orlov (son of Princess Fadia of Egypt);
- Princess Olga, Duchess of Aosta (fourth cousin twice removed);
- Helen Louise Kirby, Countess Dvinskaya (paternal grandaunt; elder half-sister of his paternal grandmother);
- Princess Elizabeth Lopoukhina;
- Oksana Girko;
- Yulia Abrosina.

Alexander's baptisim marks the first time a descendant of the House of Romanov has been baptized in Russia since the Russian Revolution.

The Grand Duke and Princess Victoria had a daughter, born in Rome on 2 June 2025, Her Serene Highness Princess Kira Leonida Georgievna Romanova. Princess Kira was baptized on 13 July 2025 in the Cathedral of Christ the Saviour in Moscow. Princess Kira's godparents are Prince Emanuele Filiberto of Savoy, Prince Boris of Bulgaria, Prince David VII of Georgia, Archduke Maximilian of Austria, as well as the Russian Ambassador to the Seychelles, Artem Kozhin, his wife, Elena, and Oksana Hoffman Girey.

== Honours ==
=== Title ===
- His Imperial Highness the Grand Duke George Mikhailovich of Russia, Prince of Prussia

=== Russian dynastic honours ===
- House of Romanov: Knight of the Imperial Order of Saint Andrew
- House of Romanov: Knight of the Imperial Order of Saint Alexander Nevsky
- House of Romanov: Knight of the Imperial Order of the White Eagle
- House of Romanov: Knight Grand Cordon of the Imperial Order of Saint Anna
- House of Romanov: Knight Grand Cordon of the Imperial Order of Saint Stanislaus
- House of Romanov: Recipient of the 400th Anniversary Medal of the House of Romanov

=== Foreign honours ===
- Prussian Royal Family: Knight of the Order of the Black Eagle
- Portuguese Royal Family: Knight Grand Cross of the Royal Order of the Immaculate Conception of Vila Viçosa
- Italian Royal Family: Knight of the Order of the Most Holy Annunciation
- Italian Royal Family: Knight Grand Cross of the Order of Saints Maurice and Lazarus
- Sovereign Military Order of Malta: Bailiff Knight Grand Cross of Honour and Devotion of the Order of Saint John

=== Ecclesiastical honours ===
- Russian Orthodox Church Outside Russia: Medal of Saint Raphael of Brooklyn, 1st Class (Note: "For hard work by strengthening the good work of the Imperial Fund for the Study of Oncology and in connection with the long-term, dedicated and glorious service to the good of the peoples of our Fatherland and the Russian Diaspora".)
- Archdiocese of Russian Orthodox churches in Western Europe: Order of St. Alexander Nevsky

== Ancestry ==
Ancestors of Grand Duke George Mikhailovich of Russia

8. Prince Joachim of Prussia
4. Prince Karl Franz of Prussia
9. Princess Marie-Auguste of Anhalt
2. Prince Franz Wilhelm of Prussia
10. Prince Johann George of Schönaich-Carolath
5. Princess Henriette of Schönaich-Carolath
11. Princess Hermine Reuss of Greiz
1. Grand Duke George Mikhailovich of Russia
12. Cyril Vladimirovich, Grand Duke of Russia
6. Vladimir Cyrillovich, Grand Duke of Russia
13. Princess Victoria Melita of Saxe-Coburg and Gotha
3. Maria Vladimirovna, Grand Duchess of Russia
14. Prince George Bagration of Mukhrani
7. Princess Leonida Bagration of Mukhrani
15. Helena Złotnicka h. Nowina
