= 1919 Reuss-Greiz state election =

German state election

The 1919 Reuss-Greiz state election was held on 2 February 1919 to elect the 15 members of the Landtag of Reuss-Greiz.

== Results ==
Party	Votes	%	Seats
Independent Social Democratic Party of Germany	15,755	44.51	7
German Democratic Party	8,025	22.67	4
German National People's Party	5,963	16.85	2
Social Democratic Party of Germany	5,653	15.97	2
Total	35,396	100.00	15
Registered voters/turnout	47,376	–	
Source: Elections in the Weimar Republic,
