= Princess Ida of Schaumburg-Lippe =

Princess Ida
- Princess Reuss of Greiz
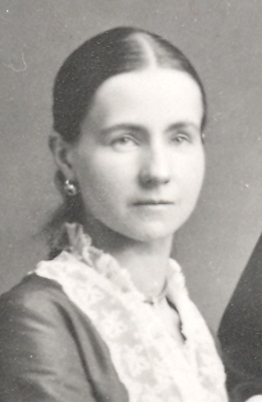
- Born: 28 July 1852; Bückeburg
- Died: 28 September 1891 (aged 39); Schleiz
- Burial: Waldhaus Mausoleum (until 1969); Neuen Friedhof, Greiz (1969–1977); Stadtkirche St. Marien, Greiz (since 1977)
- Spouse: Heinrich XXII, Prince Reuss of Greiz (m. 1872)
- Issue: Henry XXIV, Prince Reuss of Greiz; Emma, Countess Künigl von Ehrenburg; Marie, Baroness von Gnagnoni; Caroline, Grand Duchess of Saxe-Weimar-Eisenach; Hermine Reuss of Greiz; Ida, Princess of Stolberg-Roßla
Names
- German: Ida Mathilde Adelheid
- House: Schaumburg-Lippe
- Father: Adolf I, Prince of Schaumburg-Lippe
- Mother: Princess Hermine of Waldeck and Pyrmont

Princess Ida Matilda Adelaide of Schaumburg-Lippe (28 July 1852 – 28 September 1891) was the consort of Heinrich XXII, Prince Reuss of Greiz from 1872 until her death. She was the mother of Hermine Reuss of Greiz, second wife of Wilhelm II, the last German Emperor.

== Family and early life ==
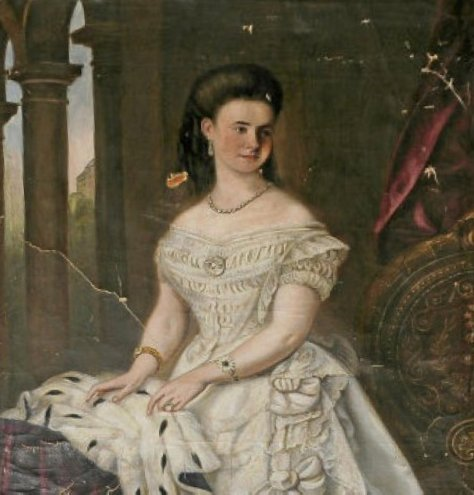
Princess Ida, circa 1872

She was a daughter of Adolf I, Prince of Schaumburg-Lippe and his wife Princess Hermine of Waldeck and Pyrmont. Her siblings included Georg, Prince of Schaumburg-Lippe and Prince Adolf of Schaumburg-Lippe, husband of Princess Viktoria of Prussia.

Despite their high birth, Ida and her siblings were brought up very simply; one report said they "knew more about the kitchen than many women of lower degree". Ida was also well educated, and was able to hold her own in discussions about philosophy and science with the learned men in her principality.

== Marriage and issue ==
On 8 October 1872, Ida married Heinrich XXII, the reigning Prince Reuss of Greiz since he came of age in 1867.

They had the following children:

- Henry XXIV, Prince Reuss of Greiz (1878–1927)
- Princess Emma (1881–1961) ∞ (1903) Count Erich Künigl von Ehrenburg (1880–1930)
- Princess Marie (1882–1942) ∞ (1904) Baron Ferdinand von Gnagnoni (1878–1955)
- Princess Caroline (1884–1905) ∞ (1903) Wilhelm Ernst, Grand Duke of Saxe-Weimar-Eisenach (1876–1923)
- Princess Hermine (1887–1947) ∞ I. (1907) Prince Johann Georg of Schoenaich-Carolath (1873–1920); ∞ II. (1922) Ex-Kaiser Wilhelm II (1859–1941)
- Princess Ida (1891–1977) ∞ (1911) Christoph Martin III Fürst zu Stolberg-Roßla (1888–1949)

=== Death ===
Ida died on 28 September 1891, at the age of 39 at Schleiz. Her husband Prince Heinrich XXII Reuss of Greiz outlived her for another 11 years, dying in 1902. She is buried alongside her husband in Stadtkirche St.Marien, Greiz, Germany.

== Ancestry ==
Ancestors of Princess Ida of Schaumburg-Lippe

8. Philip II, Count of Schaumburg-Lippe
4. George William, Prince of Schaumburg-Lippe
9. Landgravine Juliane of Hesse-Philippsthal
2. Adolf I, Prince of Schaumburg-Lippe
10. George I, Prince of Waldeck and Pyrmont
5. Princess Ida of Waldeck and Pyrmont
11. Princess Augusta of Schwarzburg-Sondershausen
1. Princess Ida of Schaumburg-Lippe
12. George I, Prince of Waldeck and Pyrmont ( = 10)
6. George II, Prince of Waldeck and Pyrmont
13. Princess Augusta of Schwarzburg-Sondershausen (= 11)
3. Princess Hermine of Waldeck and Pyrmont
14. Victor II, Prince of Anhalt-Bernburg-Schaumburg-Hoym
7. Princess Emma of Anhalt-Bernburg-Schaumburg-Hoym
15. Princess Amelie of Nassau-Weilburg

== Sources ==
- Martin, Frederick (1879). The Statesman's Year Book, 1879. London: Macmillan and Co.
- New York Evening Express (1879). New York Evening Express Almanac, Handbook of Politics. New York Evening Express Company.
