= Prince Karl Franz of Prussia =

German prince (1916–1975)

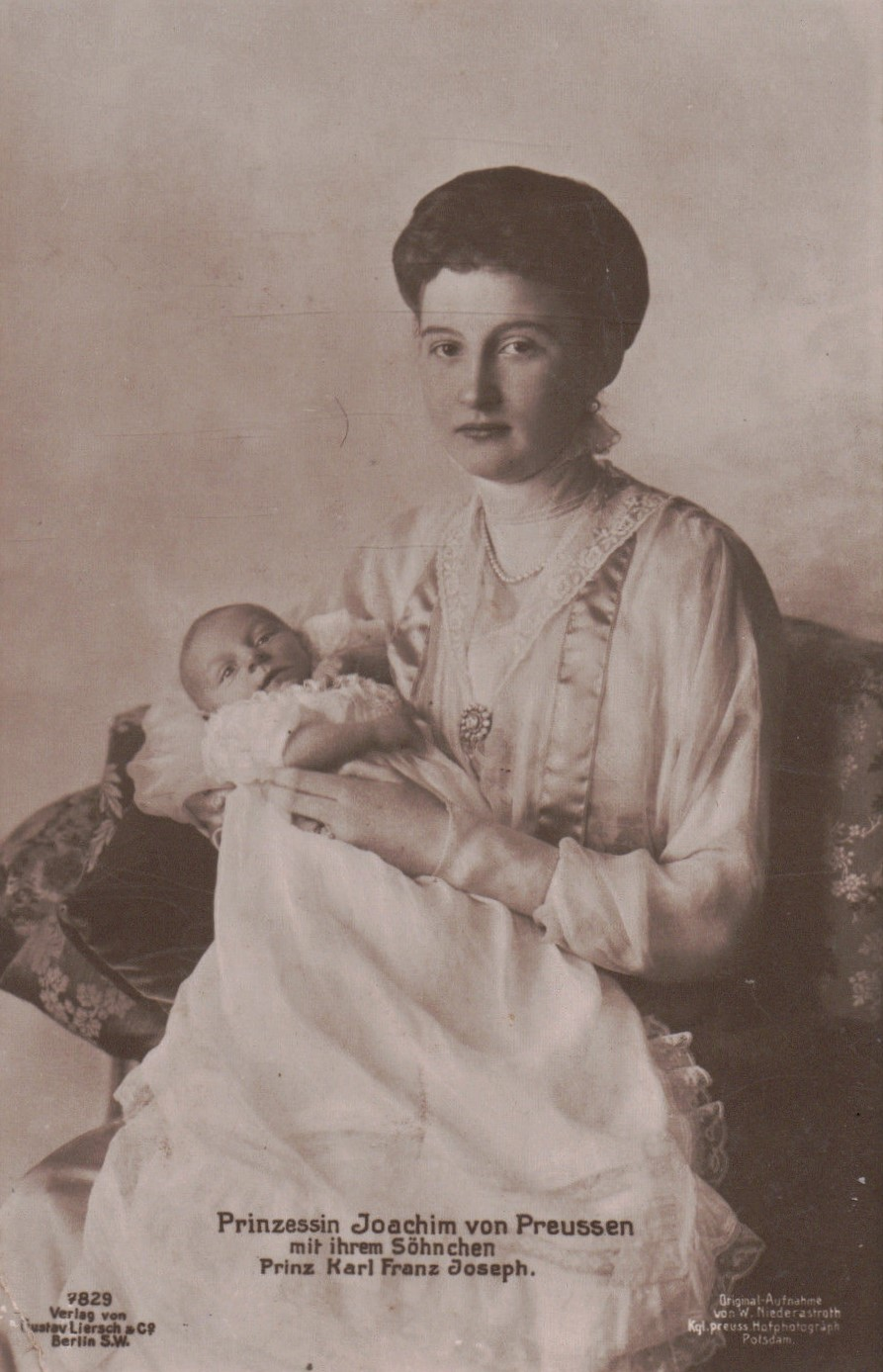
- Karl Franz photographed with his mother, Marie-Auguste
- Born: 15 December 1916; Potsdam, German Empire
- Died: 23 January 1975 (aged 58); Arica, Chile
- Burial: 25 January 1975; Fürstenfriedhof Maria-Zell, Hechingen, Baden-Württemberg, Germany
- Spouse: Princess Henriette of Schönaich-Carolath (m. 1940; div. 1946); Luise Dora Hartmann (m. 1946; div. 1959); Eva Maria Herrera y Valdeavellano (m. 1959)
- Issue: Prince Franz Wilhelm; Prince Friedrich Christian; Prince Franz Friedrich; Princess Alexandra Maria, Mrs. Reboa; Princess Désirée Anastasia, Mrs. Gamarra
Names
- German: Karl Franz Josef Wilhelm Friedrich Eduard Paul
- House: Hohenzollern
- Father: Prince Joachim of Prussia
- Mother: Princess Marie-Auguste of Anhalt
- Military career
- Allegiance: Nazi Germany
- Service: German Army
- Service years: 1939–1945
- Rank: Oberleutnant
- Conflicts: World War II

Prince Karl Franz Josef Wilhelm Friedrich Eduard Paul of Prussia (15 December 1916 – 23 January 1975) was the only child of Prince Joachim of Prussia and Princess Marie-Auguste of Anhalt. He was also a grandson of Wilhelm II, German Emperor.

== Early life ==
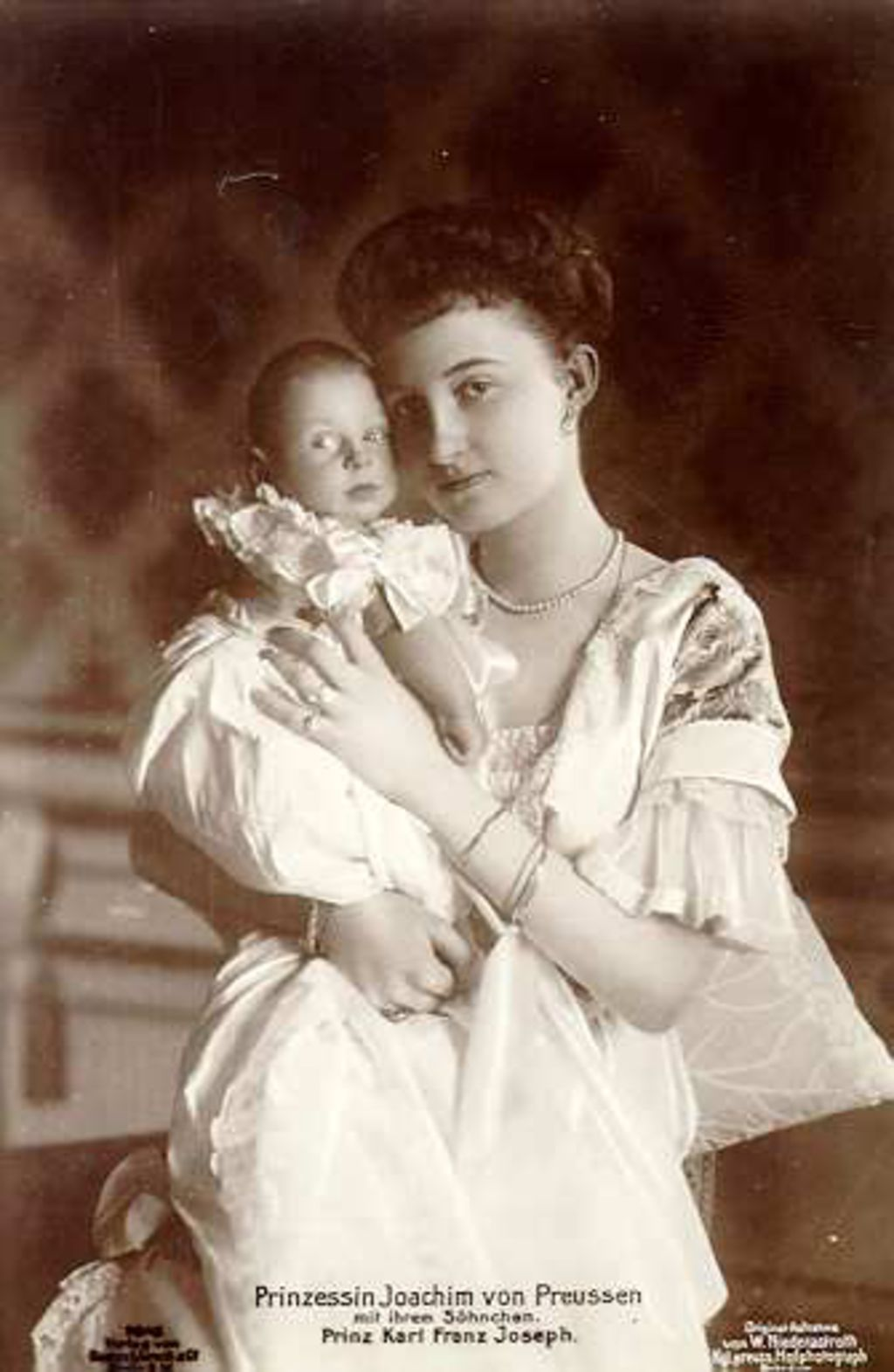
Karl Franz as a child with his mother Marie-Auguste of Anhalt.

Prince Karl Franz was born on 15 December 1916 in Potsdam. He was the only child born to Prince Joachim of Prussia and Princess Marie-Auguste of Anhalt and was the Emperor's fourth grandchild to be born since World War I began; he was consequently very young when Hohenzollern fortunes fell. His grandfather abdicated in 1918, and his father, Prince Joachim, committed suicide in 1920. At the time of his grandfather's abdication, Prince Karl Franz was twelfth in line of succession to the German and Prussian thrones.

After his father's suicide, Karl Franz was taken into custody by his paternal uncle, Prince Eitel Friedrich of Prussia. As the legal head of the House of Hohenzollern, he claimed this right because Emperor Wilhelm had issued an edict placing Hohenzollern powers in Eitel's hands. This was later declared to have been illegal, and his mother was given full custody of him in 1921. She was given this right despite the fact that she had run away from her husband and that there had been numerous servants testifying against her. Eitel's defence had also stated that Marie-Auguste was not a fit person for Karl Franz's guardianship. Marie-Auguste went to court however and made a plea that she was heartbroken, which may have helped win the case for her.

In 1922, Marie-Auguste sued ex-Emperor Wilhelm for financial support that had been promised in her and Joachim's marriage contract. Wilhelm's attorney argued that the House of Hohenzollern laws were no longer valid, and therefore there was no obligation to support her.

In 1926, his mother remarried to Johannes-Michael, Baron von Loën. They were divorced in 1935.

In World War II, Karl Franz served as a lieutenant in an armoured car division, and at one point was stationed on the Polish front. He was awarded the Iron Cross.

== Marriages ==
=== First ===
On 1 October 1940, Karl Franz married Princess Henriette Hermine Wanda Ida Luise of Schönaich-Carolath. She was the daughter of Princess Hermine Reuss of Greiz, who had been the second wife of Karl Franz's grandfather Emperor Wilhelm II since 1922 (Henriette was thus Kaiser Wilhelm's stepdaughter). Held at Wilhelm's private residence without much ceremony, he and Hermine attended the ceremony, as did a few other guests. The Mayor of Doorn performed the ceremony.

They had three sons:

- Prince Franz Wilhelm of Prussia (born 3 September 1943), married in 1976 to Maria Vladimirovna, Grand Duchess of Russia, claimant to the Headship of the Imperial Family of Russia; they divorced in 1985 and had one son, George Mikhailovich Romanov. He married secondly in 2019 to Nadia Nour El Etreby (born 2 August 1949).
- Prince Friedrich Christian of Prussia (3 September 1943 – 26 September 1943)
- Prince Franz Friedrich of Prussia (born 17 October 1944), married firstly in 1970 in a morganatic marriage to Gudrun Edith Winkler (born 29 January 1949), divorced in 1996, and had one daughter, Christine Prinzessin von Preußen (born 22 February 1968). He married secondly in 1998 to Potsdam politician and former pianist Susann Genske (born 12 January 1964), with no issue.

They divorced in 1946.

=== Second ===
Karl Franz married secondly, on 9 November 1946, to Luise Dora Hartmann (5 September 1909 Hamburg, Germany – 23 April 1961 Hamburg, Germany). Their marriage was childless and the couple divorced in 1959.

=== Third ===
Karl Franz married lastly, on 20 July 1959 in Lima, Peru, Eva Maria Herrera y Valdeavellano (10 June 1922 Lima, Peru – 6 March 1987 Lima, Peru). They were married until Prince Karl's death and had two daughters:

- Alexandra Maria Augusta Juana Consuelo Prinzessin von Preußen (born 29 April 1960 Lima, Peru). She married Dr. Alberto Reboa in October 1995 in Hechingen, Germany. They have two children (Alberto and Alexandra).
- Désirée Anastasia Maria Benedicta Prinzessin von Preußen (born 13 July 1961 Lima, Peru). She married Juan Carlos Gamarra y Skeels, Ambassador of Peru to Switzerland, to the Holy See, then to the United Kingdom, on 25 May 1983 at Lima, Peru. They have two children (Juan Francisco and Ines Sofia).

== Ancestry ==
Ancestors of Prince Karl Franz of Prussia

8. Frederick III, German Emperor
4. Wilhelm II, German Emperor
9. Victoria, Princess Royal
2. Prince Joachim of Prussia
10. Frederick VIII, Duke of Schleswig-Holstein
5. Princess Augusta Victoria of Schleswig-Holstein-Sonderburg-Augustenburg
11. Princess Adelheid of Hohenlohe-Langenburg
1. Prince Karl Franz of Prussia
12. Frederick I, Duke of Anhalt
6. Eduard, Duke of Anhalt
13. Princess Antoinette of Saxe-Altenburg
3. Princess Marie-Auguste of Anhalt
14. Prince Moritz of Saxe-Altenburg
7. Princess Louise Charlotte of Saxe-Altenburg
15. Princess Augusta of Saxe-Meiningen
