= Heinrich XXIV, Prince Reuss of Greiz =

Heinrich XXIV
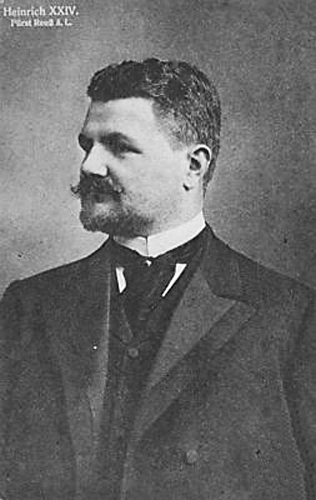
- Heinrich XXIV c. 1905

Prince Reuss of Greiz
- Reign: 19 April 1902 – 10 November 1918
- Predecessor: Heinrich XXII
- Successor: Monarchy abolished
- Born: 20 March 1878; Greiz, Principality of Reuss-Greiz, German Empire
- Died: 13 October 1927 (aged 49); Greiz, Thuringia, German Reich
- House: Reuss Elder Line
- Father: Heinrich XXII, Prince Reuss of Greiz
- Mother: Princess Ida of Schaumburg-Lippe

Heinrich XXIV, Prince Reuss of Greiz (German: Heinrich XXIV Fürst Reuß zu Greiz; 20 March 1878 – 13 October 1927) was the last reigning Prince Reuss of Greiz from 1902 to 1918. He remained head of the House Reuss of Greiz, which became extinct at his death in 1927.

== Early life ==
Heinrich XXIV was born at Greiz, Principality of Reuss-Greiz, only son of Heinrich XXII, Prince Reuss of Greiz, (son of Heinrich XX, Prince Reuss of Greiz, and Princess Caroline of Hesse-Homburg) and his wife, Princess Ida of Schaumburg-Lippe, (daughter of Adolf I, Prince of Schaumburg-Lippe and Princess Hermine of Waldeck-Pyrmont).

He had five younger sisters: Princess Emma Reuss of Greiz, later Countess Künigl von Ehrenburg (1881–1961), Princess Marie Reuss of Greiz, later Baroness von Gnagnoni (1882–1942), Princess Caroline Reuss of Greiz, later Grand Duchess of Saxe-Weimar and Eisenach (1884–1905), Princess Hermine Reuss of Greiz, later Princess of Schönaich-Carolath and titular Empress of Germany (1887–1947), and Princess Ida Reuss of Greiz, later Princess of Stolberg-Rossla (1891–1977).

== Prince Reuss of Greiz ==
On the death of his father on 19 April 1902, Heinrich XXIV succeeded him as Prince Reuss of Greiz.

Because of Heinrich XXIV's physical and mental disabilities, the result of a childhood accident, Heinrich XIV, Prince Reuss Younger Line, served as regent of Reuss Elder Line from 1902 until his death in 1913; the regency continued thereafter under Heinrich XIV's successor, Heinrich XXVII, until the abolition of the German monarchies in 1918.

On Heinrich XXIV's death in 1927, the House Reuss of Greiz became extinct, the prince having died unmarried with no issue; the titles passed to Heinrich XXVII of Reuss Younger Line.

== Death ==
Heinrich XXIV died on 13 October 1927 in Greiz, at the age of 49. He is buried in Stadtkirche St.Marien, Greiz, Germany.

== Ancestry ==
Ancestors of Heinrich XXIV, Prince Reuss of Greiz

8. Heinrich XIII, Prince Reuss of Greiz
4. Heinrich XX, Prince Reuss of Greiz
9. Princess Wilhelmine Louise of Nassau-Weilburg
2. Heinrich XXII, Prince Reuss of Greiz
10. Gustav, Landgrave of Hesse-Homburg
5. Princess Caroline of Hesse-Homburg
11. Princess Louise of Anhalt-Dessau
1. Heinrich XXIV, Prince Reuss of Greiz
12. George William, Prince of Schaumburg-Lippe
6. Adolf I, Prince of Schaumburg-Lippe
13. Princess Ida of Waldeck and Pyrmont
3. Princess Ida of Schaumburg-Lippe
14. George II, Prince of Waldeck and Pyrmont
7. Princess Hermine of Waldeck and Pyrmont
15. Princess Emma of Anhalt-Bernburg-Schaumburg-Hoym

Heinrich XXIV, Prince Reuss of Greiz House Reuss of Greiz Cadet branch of the House of Reuss Born: 20 March 1878 Died: 13 October 1927
Regnal titles
Preceded by Heinrich XXII	Prince Reuss of Greiz; 1902 – 1918	Principality abolished
Titles in pretence
Loss of title	— TITULAR — Prince Reuss of Greiz; 1918 – 1927; Reason for succession failure: Principality abolished in 1918	Succeeded by Heinrich XXVII Reuss of Schleiz as Prince Reuss
