= Heinrich XXII, Prince Reuss of Greiz =

Heinrich XXII
- Prince Reuss of Greiz
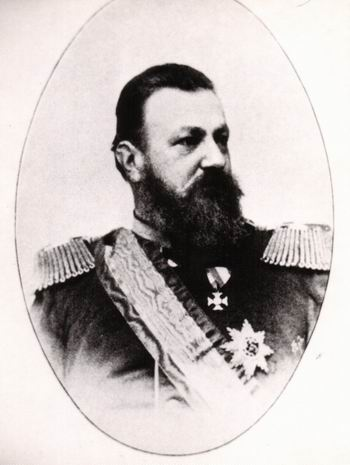
- Prince Heinrich XXII, c. 1902

Prince of Greiz
- Reign: 8 November 1859 - 19 April 1902
- Predecessor: Prince Heinrich XX
- Successor: Heinrich XXIV
- Regent: Princess Caroline of Hesse-Homburg (1859-1867)
- Born: 28 March 1846; Greiz, Principality of Reuss-Greiz
- Died: 19 April 1902 (aged 56); Greiz, Principality of Reuss-Greiz
- Spouse: Princess Ida of Schaumburg-Lippe (m. 1872; died 1891)
- Issue: Henry XXIV, Prince Reuss of Greiz; Emma, Countess Erich Künigl von Ehrenburg; Marie, Baroness Giovanni von Gnagnoni; Caroline, Grand Duchess of Saxe-Weimar-Eisenach; Hermine, German Empress; Ida, Princess of Stolberg-Rossla
- House: Reuss Elder Line
- Father: Heinrich XX, Prince Reuss of Greiz
- Mother: Princess Caroline of Hesse-Homburg

Heinrich XXII, Prince Reuss of Greiz (28 March 1846 – 19 April 1902) was the reigning sovereign of Reuss-Greiz, a small principality of the German states, from 1859 until his death in 1902.

== Reign ==
Heinrich succeeded as reigning Prince Reuss of Greiz after the death of his father on 8 November 1859. As Heinrich was a mere thirteen years of age, his mother Caroline of Hesse-Homburg (1819-1872) served as regent until his majority at the age of 21. As the daughter of an Austrian general and the wife of an Austrian officer, Caroline was vehemently anti-Prussian. As a result, during the Austro-Prussian War, Reuss was occupied by Prussian troops, who remained until a payment of 100,000 thalers was made.

On 28 March 1867, Heinrich took the reins of government into his own hands. Upon taking full power, he gave his principality its first constitution. Like his parents, Heinrich remained anti-Prussian his entire life, repeatedly rejecting Prussian measures such as Kulturkampf and the creation of civil marriages. Heinrich, as well as his subjects in Reuss, refused fully to accept that the Hohenzollern German Emperors had precedence over other royal houses. For instance, when asked about his relationship with the Emperor, Heinrich would simply respond that they "were allies for the common defense of the German Federation". Heinrich lost no opportunity to displease the Emperor, declining to permit the construction of any memorial to Emperor Wilhelm I, Wilhelm II's beloved grandfather but this was later forced upon him. Heinrich also refused to tolerate any demonstrations of mourning, either official or in private, when the deaths of emperors Wilhelm I and Frederick III occurred, and forbade any celebration of the anniversaries of the German victories of 1870 but this was done any way and could not be punished and was ignored and punishment not enforced and done anyway .

Heinrich was very wealthy, as the greater part of the territory he ruled over was his private property. At the end of his rule, Reuss contained fewer than 70,000 people, and comprised an area of 122 square miles.

=== Frankfurt National Assembly ===
In the late 1840s, there were discussions at the Frankfurt National Assembly for the creation of a hereditary imperial royal family that would rule over a united Germany, along with a new parliament and constitution. There was much debate however on which particular royal dynasty would become Emperor, as many Germans refused to back the Hohenzollern claim. This led Prince John of Saxony for instance to remark that "If the nine Electors of the old German Empire were restored, the Prince of Reuss-Greiz would have a better chance of being Emperor than the King of Prussia".

== Marriage and issue ==
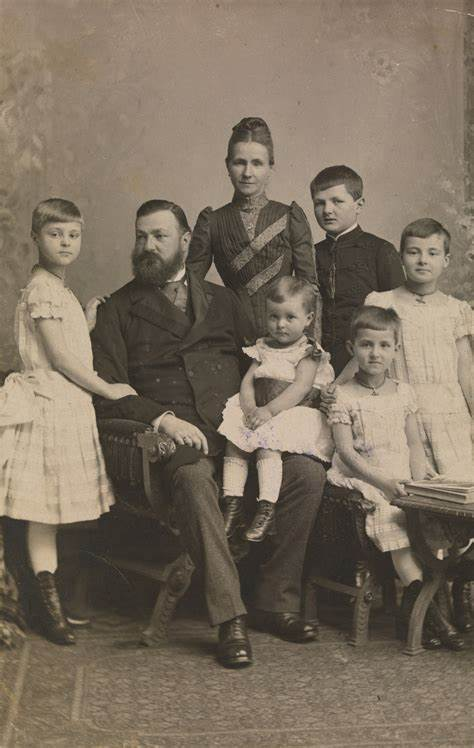
Heinrich XXII with his wife Princess Ida and their children.

On 8 October 1872, he married Princess Ida of Schaumburg-Lippe, daughter of Adolf I, Prince of Schaumburg-Lippe. They had six children:

- Henry XXIV, Prince Reuss of Greiz (20 March 1878 – 13 October 1927)
- Princess Emma Reuss of Greiz (17 January 1881 – 6 December 1961) ∞ (1903) Count Erich Künigl von Ehrenburg (1880–1930)
- Princess Marie Reuss of Greiz (26 March 1882 – 1 November 1942) ∞ (1904) Baron Giovanni von Gnagnoni (1878–1955)
- Princess Caroline Reuss of Greiz (13 July 1884 – 17 January 1905) ∞ (1903) Wilhelm Ernst, Grand Duke of Saxe-Weimar-Eisenach (1876–1923)
- Princess Hermine Reuss of Greiz (17 December 1887 – 7 August 1947) ∞ I. (1907) Prince Johann Georg of Schoenaich-Carolath (1873–1920); ∞ II. (1922) Wilhelm II, German Emperor (1859–1941)
- Princess Ida Reuss of Greiz (4 September 1891 – 29 March 1977) ∞ (1911) Christoph Martin, Prince of Stolberg-Rossla (1888–1949)

== Death and succession ==
Prince Heinrich died of heart trouble on 19 April 1902. His death meant his mentally and physically disabled only son Prince Heinrich became reigning prince of Reuss. As the prince was clearly unable to fulfill these duties, arrangements for a regency were made. A younger branch of the Reuss family was next-in-line to the title, but there was some concern that Heinrich might choose another for the regency, as he disliked them. In the end, Heinrich's distant cousin Prince Heinrich XXVII of Reuss zu Schleiz was chosen; his wife, Princess Elise of Hohenlohe-Langenburg was a cousin of both Kaiser and his wife Empress Augusta Viktoria, and the prince himself had served alongside Emperor Wilhelm in the regiment of the Hussars of the Guard, thus repairing relations between the houses of Hohenzollern and Reuss.

== Ancestry ==
Ancestors of Heinrich XXII, Prince Reuss of Greiz

8. Heinrich XI, Prince Reuss of Greiz
4. Heinrich XIII, Prince Reuss of Greiz
9. Countess Conradine Eleonore Reuss of Köstritz
2. Heinrich XX, Prince Reuss of Greiz
10. Charles Christian, Prince of Nassau-Weilburg
5. Princess Wilhelmine Louise of Nassau-Weilburg
11. Princess Carolina of Orange-Nassau
1. Heinrich XXII, Prince Reuss of Greiz
12. Frederick V, Landgrave of Hesse-Homburg
6. Gustav, Landgrave of Hesse-Homburg
13. Landgravine Caroline of Hesse-Darmstadt
3. Princess Caroline of Hesse-Homburg
14. Frederick, Hereditary Prince of Anhalt-Dessau
7. Princess Louise Friederike of Anhalt-Dessau
15. Landgravine Amalie of Hesse-Homburg

== Sources ==
- Harbutt Dawson, William (1919). The German Empire, 1867-1914, and the Unity Movement. New York: Macmillan and Co.
- Martin, Frederick (1879). The Statesman's Year Book, 1879. London: Macmillan and Co.
- Martin, Frederick (1889). The Statesman's Year Book, 1889. London: Macmillan and Co.

Heinrich XXII, Prince Reuss of Greiz House Reuss of Greiz Cadet branch of the House of Reuss Born: 28 March 1846 Died: 19 April 1902
Regnal titles
| Preceded by Heinrich XX | Prince Reuss of Greiz; 1859 – 1902 | Succeeded by Heinrich XXIV |
