= Hermine Reuss of Greiz =

Second wife of Wilhelm II (1887–1947)

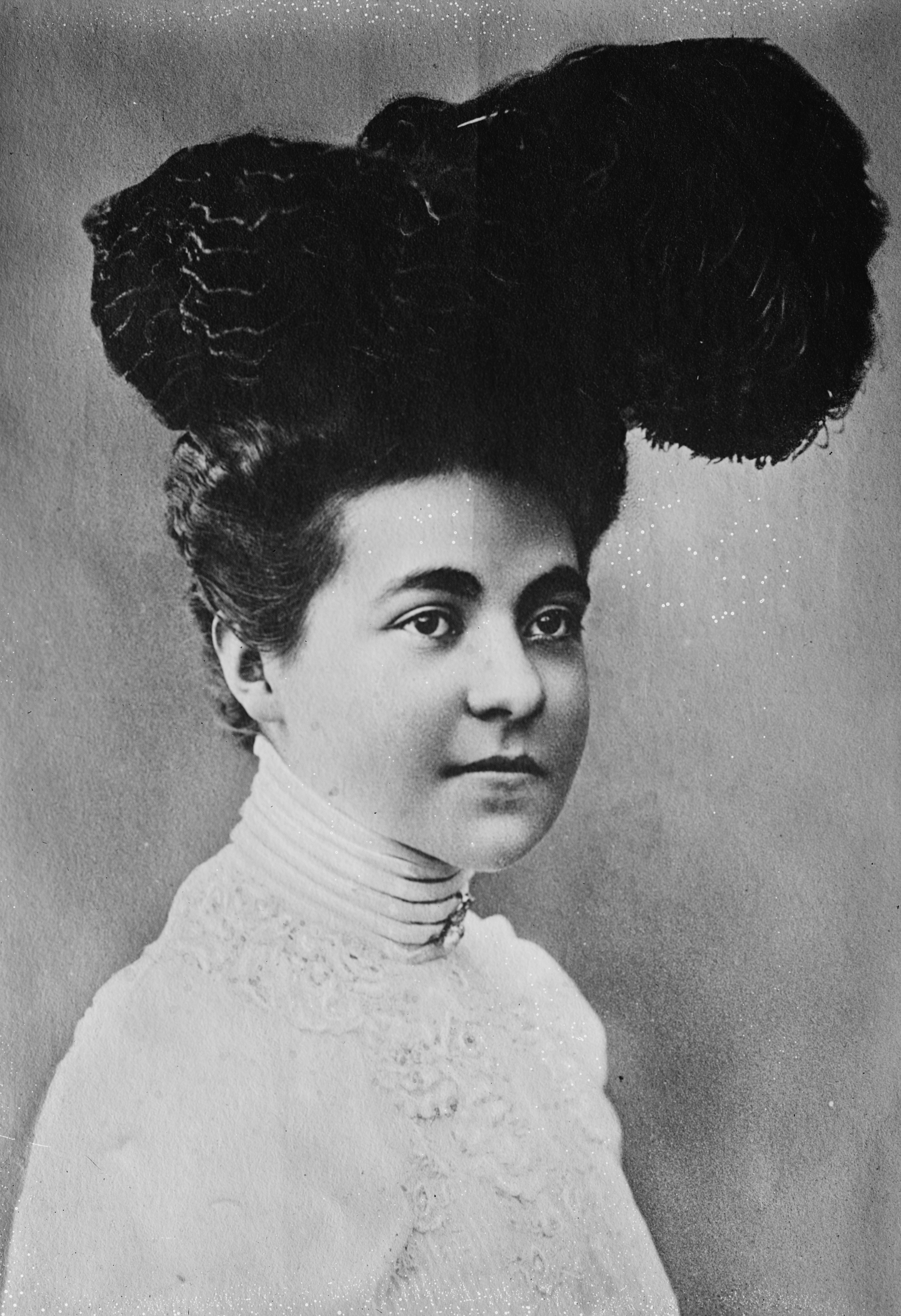
- Born: 17 December 1887; Greiz, Germany
- Died: 7 August 1947 (aged 59); Frankfurt an der Oder, Germany
- Burial: 15 August 1947; Antique Temple, Sanssouci Park, Potsdam
- Spouse: Prince Johann of Schönaich-Carolath (m. 1907; died 1920) Wilhelm II, German Emperor (m. 1922; died 1941)
- Issue: Prince Hans Georg of Schönaich-Carolath; Prince Georg Wilhelm of Schönaich-Carolath; Princess Hermine Caroline of Schönaich-Carolath; Prince Ferdinand Johann of Schönaich-Carolath; Princess Henriette of Schönaich-Carolath
- House: Reuss Elder Line
- Father: Heinrich XXII, Prince Reuss of Greiz
- Mother: Princess Ida of Schaumburg-Lippe

Princess Hermine Reuss of Greiz (German: Hermine, Prinzessin Reuß zu Greiz; 17 December 1887 – 7 August 1947) was the second wife of Wilhelm II, German Emperor. They were married in 1922, four years after he abdicated. Wilhelm was her second husband; her first husband, Prince Johann of Schönaich-Carolath, had died in 1920. She was called Kaiserin, 'Empress' Hermine by some supporters of the Hohenzollern dynasty.

== Early life ==
Princess Hermine was born in Greiz as the fifth child and fourth daughter of Heinrich XXII, Prince Reuss of Greiz and Princess Ida Mathilde Adelheid of Schaumburg-Lippe, daughter of Adolf I, Prince of Schaumburg-Lippe. Her father was the ruler of the Principality of Reuss-Greiz, a state of the German Empire, in what is present-day Thuringia. Princess Hermine's disabled elder brother Heinrich XXIV, Prince Reuss of Greiz became the ruling prince in 1902.

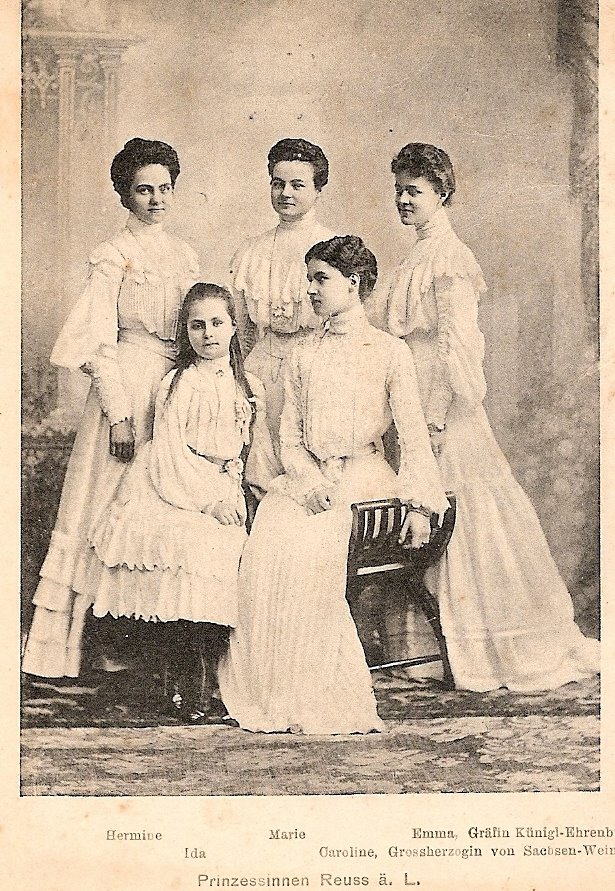
Hermine (left) and her sisters, 1903

== First marriage ==
Princess Hermine was married on 7 January 1907 in Greiz to Prince Johann George Ludwig Ferdinand August of Schönaich-Carolath (11 September 1873 – 7 April 1920), the eldest son and child of Prince Georg Heinrich Friedrich August von Schönaich-Carolath and Princess Wanda Adelheid Blanka Clementine Cäcilie von Schönaich-Carolath.

They were the parents of five children:

- Prince Hans Georg Heinrich Ludwig Friedrich Hermann Ferdinand of Schönaich-Carolath (3 November 1907 – 9 August 1943), married Baroness Sibylle von Zedlitz und Leipe, killed in action at the Eastern Front during the Second World War.
- Prince Georg Wilhelm of Schönaich-Carolath (16 March 1909 – 1 November 1927), died unmarried.
- Princess Hermine Caroline Wanda Ida Luise Feodora Viktoria Auguste of Schönaich-Carolath (9 May 1910 – 30 May 1959), married Hugo Herbert Hartung.
- Prince Ferdinand Johann Georg Hermann Heinrich Ludwig Wilhelm Friedrich August of Schönaich-Carolath (5 April 1913 – 17 October 1973), married Rose Rauch (1912–1987), then Baroness Margarethe von Seckendorff (1908–1991).
- Princess Henriette Hermine Wanda Ida Luise of Schönaich-Carolath (25 November 1918 – 16 March 1972), married Wilhelm II's grandson Prince Karl Franz of Prussia (son of Prince Joachim of Prussia) in 1940 and had issue.

== Marriage to ex-Emperor Wilhelm II ==
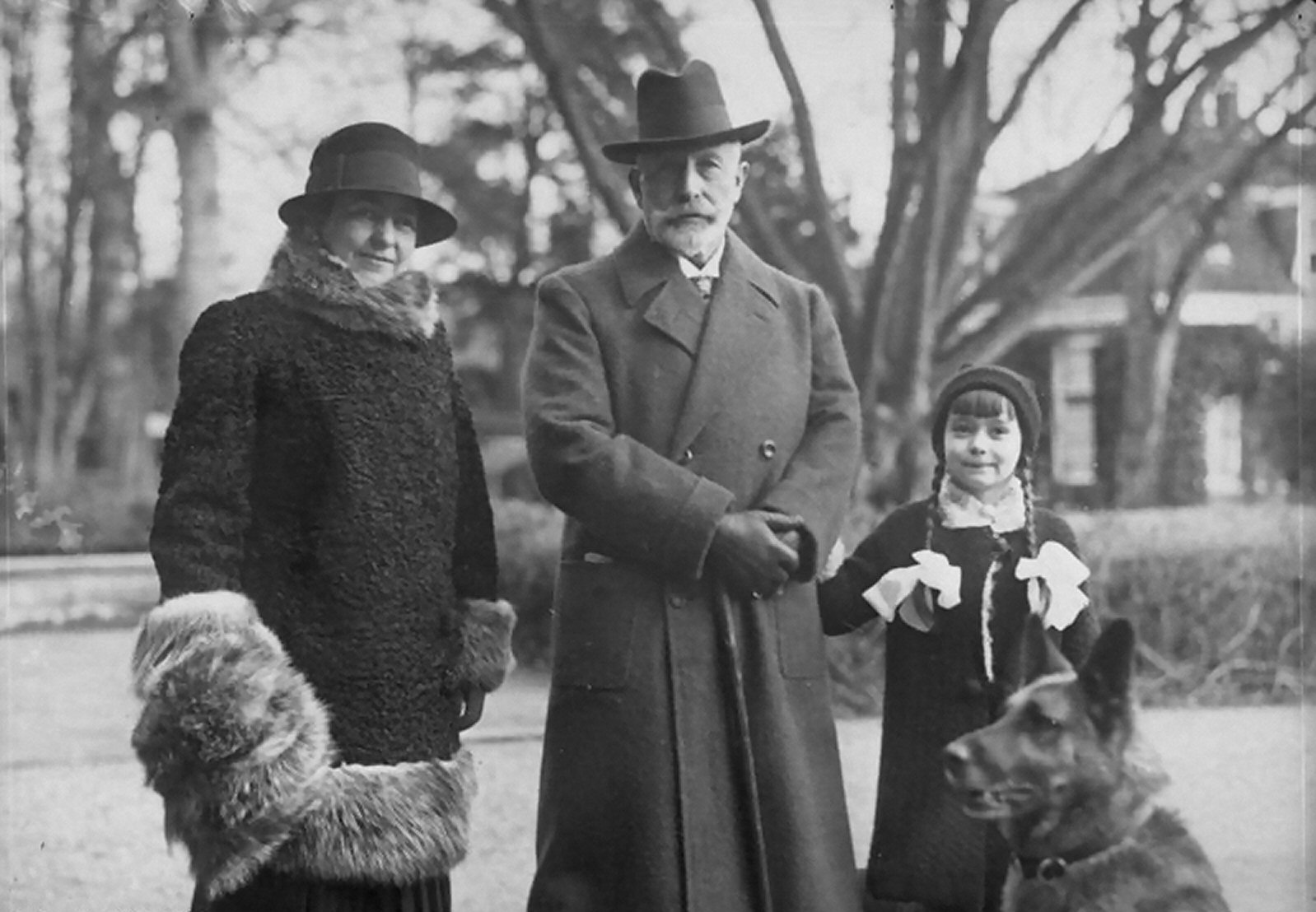
Hermine with Wilhelm II and her daughter Henriette in Doorn, 1931

In January 1922, a son of Princess Hermine sent birthday wishes to the exiled German Emperor Wilhelm II, who then invited the boy and his mother to Huis Doorn. Wilhelm found Hermine very attractive, and greatly enjoyed her company. The two had much in common, both being recently widowed: Hermine just over a year and a half before and Wilhelm only nine months prior.

By early 1922, Wilhelm was determined to marry Hermine. Despite grumblings from Wilhelm's monarchist supporters and the objections of his children, 63-year-old Wilhelm and 34-year-old Hermine married on 5 November 1922 in Doorn. Wilhelm's physician, Alfred Haehner, suspected that Hermine had married the former kaiser only in the belief that she would become an empress and that she had become increasingly bitter as it became apparent that would not be the case. Shortly before the couple's first wedding anniversary, Haehner recorded how Hermine had told him how "inconsiderately [Wilhelm] behaved towards her" and how Wilhelm's face showed "a strong dislike" for his wife.

In 1927, Hermine wrote An Empress in Exile: My Days in Doorn, an account of her life until then. She cared for the property management of Huis Doorn and by establishing her own relief organization, she stayed in contact with monarchist and nationalist circles in the Weimar Republic. Hermine also shared her husband's anti-Semitism. She remained a constant companion to the aging emperor until his death in 1941. They had no children.

== Later life ==
Following the death of Wilhelm, Hermine returned to Germany to live on her first husband's estate in Saabor, Lower Silesia. During the Vistula–Oder Offensive of early 1945, she fled from the advancing Red Army to her sister's estate in Rossla, Thuringia. After the end of the Second World War, she was held under house arrest at Frankfurt an der Oder in the Soviet occupation zone, and later imprisoned in the Paulinenhof Internment Camp.

She was buried in the Antique Temple of Sanssouci Park, Potsdam, in what would become East Germany. Some years earlier, it was the resting place of several other members of the imperial family, including Wilhelm's first wife, Augusta Victoria of Schleswig-Holstein.

== Dramatic representation ==
In 2017, Janet McTeer played a fictional Empress Hermine in The Exception alongside Christopher Plummer as Kaiser Wilhelm II.

== Ancestry ==
Ancestors of Hermine Reuss of Greiz

8. Heinrich XIII, Prince Reuss (Elder Line)
4. Heinrich XX, Prince Reuss (Elder Line)
9. Princess Louise of Nassau-Weilburg
2. Heinrich XXII, Prince Reuss (Elder Line)
10. Gustav, Landgrave of Hesse-Homburg
5. Princess Caroline of Hesse-Homburg
11. Princess Louise Friederike of Anhalt-Dessau
1. Princess Hermine Reuss (Elder Line)
12. George William, Prince of Schaumburg-Lippe
6. Adolf I, Prince of Schaumburg-Lippe
13. Princess Ida of Waldeck and Pyrmont
3. Princess Ida of Schaumburg-Lippe
14. George II, Prince of Waldeck and Pyrmont
7. Princess Hermine of Waldeck and Pyrmont
15. Princess Emma of Anhalt-Bernburg-Schaumburg-Hoym

Hermine Reuss of Greiz
House of Reuss
Born: 17 December 1887 Died: 7 August 1947
