= Prince Joachim of Prussia =

Prussian prince (1890–1920)

Prince Joachim
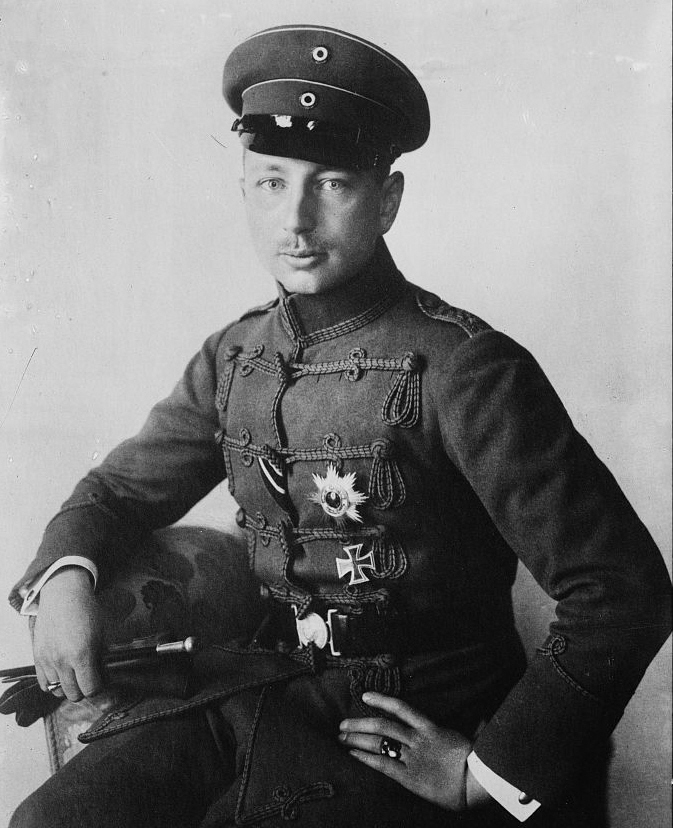
- Born: 17 December 1890; Berlin Palace, Kingdom of Prussia, German Empire
- Died: 18 July 1920 (aged 29); Potsdam, Free State of Prussia, Weimar Republic
- Burial: 21 July 1920; Antique Temple, Potsdam, Germany
- Spouse: Princess Marie-Auguste of Anhalt (m. 1916; div. 1919)
- Issue: Prince Karl Franz
Names
- Joachim Franz Humbert
- House: Hohenzollern
- Father: Wilhelm II, German Emperor
- Mother: Augusta Victoria of Schleswig-Holstein

Prince Joachim Franz Humbert of Prussia (17 December 1890 – 18 July 1920) was the youngest son and sixth child of Wilhelm II, German Emperor, by his first wife, Augusta Victoria of Schleswig-Holstein. He died by suicide at age 29. Prince Joachim was educated as an officer and participated in the First World War. During the war, he was considered a candidate for several newly established monarchies in Europe.

His great-grandson is Grand Duke George Mikhailovich, the heir apparent to Maria Vladimirovna, a claimant to the disputed Headship of the Imperial Family of Russia.

== Early life ==
=== Birth and family ===
Prince Joachim was born on 17 December 1890, two years after his father had become the German Emperor, at the Berlin Palace in central Berlin. He was the sixth and youngest son of Emperor Wilhelm II, and his first wife, Princess Augusta Victoria of Schleswig-Holstein.

=== Education ===
Prince Joachim spent his childhood with his siblings at the New Palace in Potsdam, and his school days at the Prinzenhaus in Plön, in his mother's ancestral Schleswig-Holstein, as his brothers had been before him.

== Marriage ==
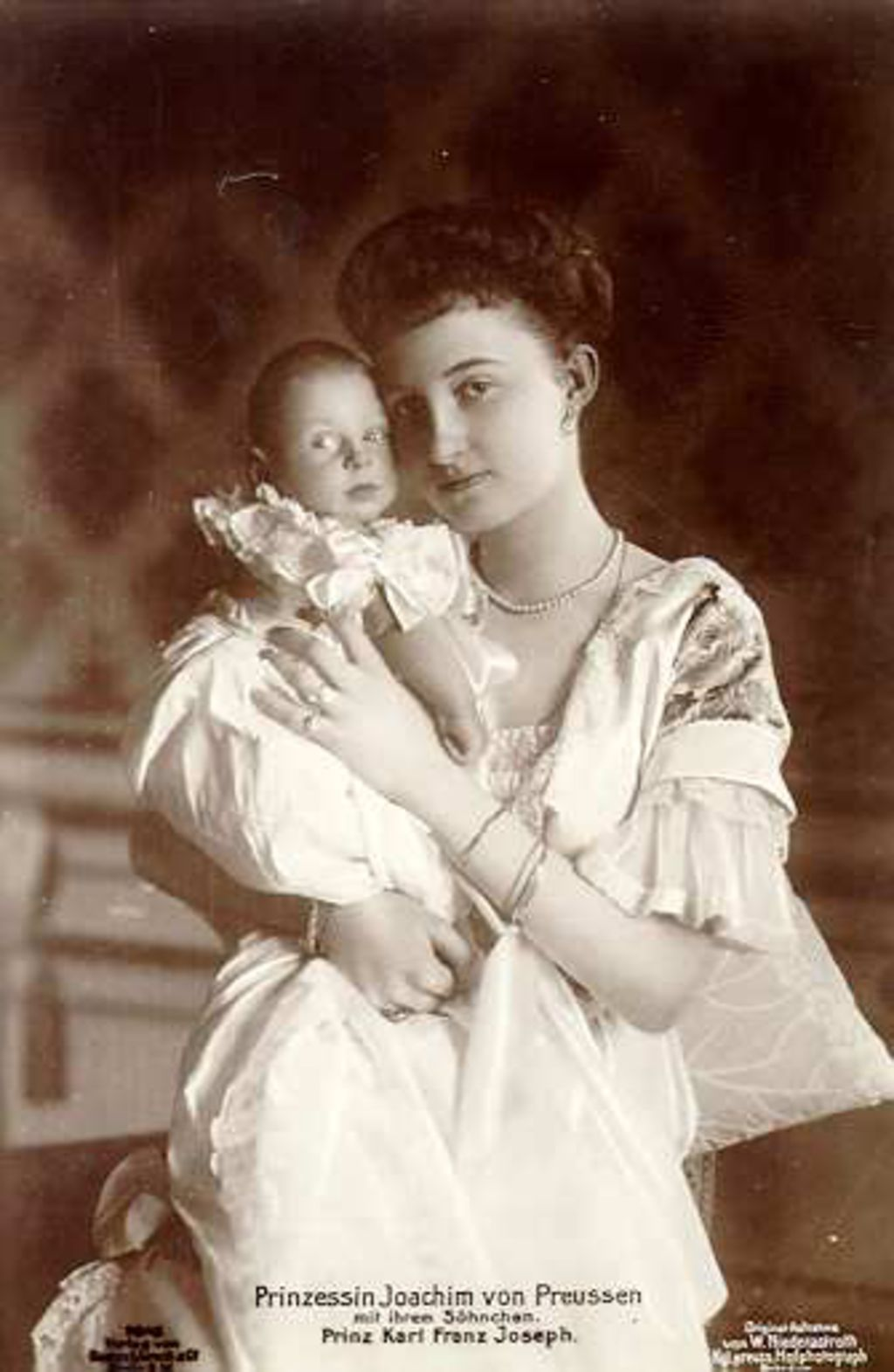
Marie-Auguste with her son.

On 11 March 1916 in Berlin, Joachim married Princess Marie-Auguste of Anhalt (10 June 1898 – 22 May 1983), the daughter of Eduard, Duke of Anhalt and his wife Princess Luise of Saxe-Altenburg (daughter of Prince Moritz of Saxe-Altenburg). He and Marie-Auguste had been engaged since 14 October of the previous year. The wedding was celebrated at Bellevue Palace, and was attended by Joachim's father and mother, the Duke and Duchess of Anhalt, as well as other relatives. They had a simple Lutheran ceremony.

The couple had one son, Prince Karl Franz Josef Wilhelm Friedrich Eduard Paul (15 December 1916 in Potsdam – 22 January 1975 in Arica, Chile). Their grandson, Prince Franz Wilhelm, married Maria Vladimirovna of Russia, a claimant to the Imperial Russian throne.

== Candidate for thrones ==
=== Ireland ===
During the Easter Rising in Dublin in 1916, some republican leaders, including Patrick Pearse and Joseph Plunkett, contemplated giving the throne of an independent Ireland to Prince Joachim. Pearse and Plunkett thought that if the rising were successful and Germany won the First World War, an independent Ireland would be a monarchy with a German prince as king, like Romania and Bulgaria before it.

The fact that Joachim did not speak English was also considered an advantage, as he might be more disposed to learning and promoting the use of the Irish language.

In his memoirs, Irish revolutionary, politician, and poet Desmond FitzGerald wrote:

"That would have certain advantages for us. It would mean that a movement for de-anglicisation would flow from the head of the state downwards, for what was English would be foreign to the head of the state. He would naturally turn to those who were more Irish and Gaelic, as to his friends, for the non-nationalist element in our country had shown themselves to be so bitterly anti-German. Such a ruler would necessarily favour the Irish language, for it would be impossible to make the country German-speaking, while it would be against his own interests to foster English. For the first generation or so it would be an advantage, in view of our natural weakness, to have a ruler who linked us with a dominant European power, and thereafter, when we were better prepared to stand alone, or when it might be undesirable that our ruler should turn by personal choice to one power rather than be guided by what was most natural and beneficial for our country, the ruler of that time would have become completely Irish."

Ernest Blythe recalled that in January 1915 he heard Plunkett and Thomas MacDonagh express support for the idea at an Irish Volunteers meeting. Bulmer Hobson, secretary of the Volunteers, was among the attendees. No objections were made by anyone and Blythe himself said he found the idea "immensely attractive".

=== Georgia ===
After Georgia's declaration of independence following the Russian Revolution of 1917, Joachim was briefly considered by the German representative Count Friedrich Werner von der Schulenburg and Georgian royalists as a candidate for the Georgian throne.

=== Lithuania ===
The Council of Lithuania declared Lithuania's independence on February 16, 1918, but the council was unable to form a government, police, or other state institutions due to the continued presence of German troops. The Germans presented various proposals to incorporate Lithuania into the German Empire, particularly Prussia.

One such proposal offered the crown of Lithuania to Joachim. The Lithuanians resisted this idea and hoped to preserve their independence by creating a separate constitutional monarchy. On 4 June 1918, they voted to offer the Lithuanian throne to the German noble Wilhelm Karl, Duke of Urach.

=== Poland ===
After the Act of 5th November, there was discussion over who would be appointed to be King of Poland. Joachim was one of the candidates.

== Divorce and death ==
Following the German Revolution in November 1918, the Emperor was forced to abdicate, thus depriving Joachim of his titles, position and prospects for heading any newly established monarchies in Europe. Unable to accept his new status as a commoner, he fell into a deep depression. On 31 May 1918, Joachim was examined by the psychiatrist Robert Gaupp, who submitted a report concluding that he "was incurably ill, both mentally and physically ... was extremely easily emotionally and sexually aroused", and "was inclined to 'violent, uncontrollably exploding outbursts of anger in which all self-control [was] lost'".

The relationship between Joachim and his wife had already started to deteriorate. The couple were divorced soon after the end of the First World War. The direct causes of the divorce are not known to the public. According to one report, Marie-Auguste had previously abandoned her husband and child to run away with another man, had been forcibly brought back home on the orders of the Kaiser, but had filed for divorce as soon as the war ended, when she saw that her husband's family were at their lowest ebb. According to Hans von Gontard, who served as the Kaiser's Hofmarschall in exile, Joachim was "quite out of control and had beaten his wife".

Following the divorce, Joachim shot himself in Potsdam on 18 July 1920. One source reports that he had been in financial straits and suffered from "great mental depression". His own brother Prince Eitel Friedrich of Prussia commented that he suffered from "a fit of excessive dementia". Kaiser Wilhelm's reaction to the news of his son's suicide was one of fury, commenting that he was outraged "that the oaf should have done this, too, to us and especially to his mother!" Although the Kaiser initially tried to convince his wife that the death of their youngest son had simply been an accident, she immediately realised what had happened, and interrupted him with the remark: "He has shot himself!" She desperately wanted to believe that his death had been accidental but she knew better.

== Children and grandchildren ==
The only issue of the marriage of Prince Joachim and Princess Marie-Auguste was their son, Prince Karl Franz Josef Wilhelm Friedrich Eduard of Prussia (15 December 1916 – 22 January 1975).

On 5 October 1940, Prince Karl married Princess Henriette Hermine Wanda Ida Luise von Schönaich-Carolath (25 November 1918 – 16 March 1972). They divorced on 5 September 1946. They were the parents of three children:

- Prince Franz Wilhelm Viktor Christoph Stephan of Prussia (born 3 September 1943), he married Maria Vladimirovna, Grand Duchess of Russia, a claimant to the disputed Russian throne. Their child is Grand Duke George Mikhailovich of Russia, Prince of Prussia, born 13 March 1981 in Spain.
- Prince Friedrich Christian Ludwig of Prussia (3 September 1943 – 26 September 1943)
- Prince Franz Friedrich Christian of Prussia (born 17 October 1944).

After the divorce, Prince Karl married, morganatically, Luise Dora Hartmann (5 September 1909 – 23 April 1961) on 9 November 1946. The childless couple divorced in 1959.

Prince Karl's last marriage was to Eva Maria Herrera y Valdeavellano (10 June 1922 – 6 March 1987) on 20 July 1959 in Lima, Peru. They were married until Prince Karl's death and had two daughters;

- Alexandra Maria Augusta Juana Consuelo Prinzessin von Preussen (born 29 April 1960)
- Désirée Anastasia Maria Benedicta Prinzessin von Preussen (born 13 July 1961).

== Regimental Commissions ==
- Leutnant (2nd Lieutenant), 1. Garderegiment zu Fuß (1st Regiment of Foot Guards)
- à la suite, 4. Gardegrenadierlandwehrregiment (4th Reserve Regiment of Grenadier Guards)

== Honours ==
Prince Joachim received the following orders and decorations:

- Kingdom of Prussia:
  - Knight of the Black Eagle, with Collar
  - Grand Cross of the Red Eagle, with Crown
  - Knight of the Royal Crown Order, 1st Class
  - Grand Commander's Cross of the Royal House Order of Hohenzollern
  - Iron Cross (1914), 2nd and 1st Classes
- (Hohenzollern-Sigmaringen) Hohenzollern: Cross of Honour of the Princely House Order of Hohenzollern, 1st Class
- (Duchy of Anhalt) Anhalt:
  - Grand Cross of the Order of Albert the Bear
  - Friedrich Cross
- Baden: Knight of the House Order of Fidelity, 1909
- Kingdom of Bavaria: Knight of St. Hubert, 1913
- Brunswick:
  - Grand Cross of the Order of Henry the Lion
  - War Merit Cross
- Grand Duchy of Hesse: Grand Cross of the Ludwig Order, 27 January 1912
- Lübeck: Hanseatic Cross
- Mecklenburg:
  - Grand Cross of the Wendish Crown, with Golden Crown
  - Military Merit Cross, 1st Class (Schwerin)
- Oldenburg: Grand Cross of the Order of Duke Peter Friedrich Ludwig, with Golden Collar and Crown
- Reuss: War Merit Cross with Swords
- Saxe-Meiningen: Cross for Merit in War
- Kingdom of Saxony:
  - Knight of the Rue Crown
  - Knight of the Albert Order, 1st Class with Crown and Swords
- Württemberg: Grand Cross of the Württemberg Crown
- (Austrian Empire) (Kingdom of Hungary) Austria-Hungary: Grand Cross of the Royal Hungarian Order of St. Stephen, 1911
- Netherlands: Grand Cross of the Netherlands Lion
- Ottoman Empire: Order of Osmanieh, 1st Class with Star in Diamonds
- United Kingdom: Honorary Grand Cross of the Royal Victorian Order, 1 July 1904

== Ancestry ==
Ancestors of Prince Joachim of Prussia

8. William I, German Emperor
4. Frederick III, German Emperor
9. Princess Augusta of Saxe-Weimar-Eisenach
2. Wilhelm II, German Emperor
10. Prince Albert of Saxe-Coburg and Gotha
5. Victoria, Princess Royal
11. Victoria, Queen of the United Kingdom
1. Prince Joachim of Prussia
12. Christian August II, Duke of Schleswig-Holstein-Sonderburg-Augustenburg
6. Frederick VIII, Duke of Schleswig-Holstein
13. Countess Louise Sophie af Danneskiold-Samsøe
3. Princess Augusta Victoria of Schleswig-Holstein-Sonderburg-Augustenburg
14. Ernst I, Prince of Hohenlohe-Langenburg
7. Princess Adelheid of Hohenlohe-Langenburg
15. Princess Feodora of Leiningen

== Portrayal in fiction ==
Prince Joachim was played by American actor Jesse Plemons and portrayed as the main antagonist in the 2021 Disney fantasy adventure film Jungle Cruise.
