= Gauthier Destenay =

Belgian architect

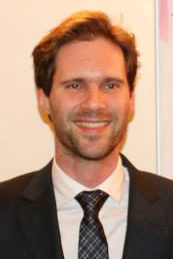
- Destenay in 2015

Spouse of the Prime Minister of Luxembourg
- In office 15 May 2015 – 17 November 2023
- Prime Minister: Xavier Bettel
- Preceded by: Christiane Juncker
- Succeeded by: Marjolijne Frieden

Personal details
- Born: Gauthier P. Destenay; 21 September 1979 (age 47) Virton, Belgium
- Party: Democratic Party
- Spouse: Xavier Bettel (m. 2015)
- Education: University of Liège

Gauthier Destenay (born 21 September 1979) is a Belgian architect who is the husband of former Prime Minister of Luxembourg and current Deputy Prime Minister Xavier Bettel.

== Personal life ==
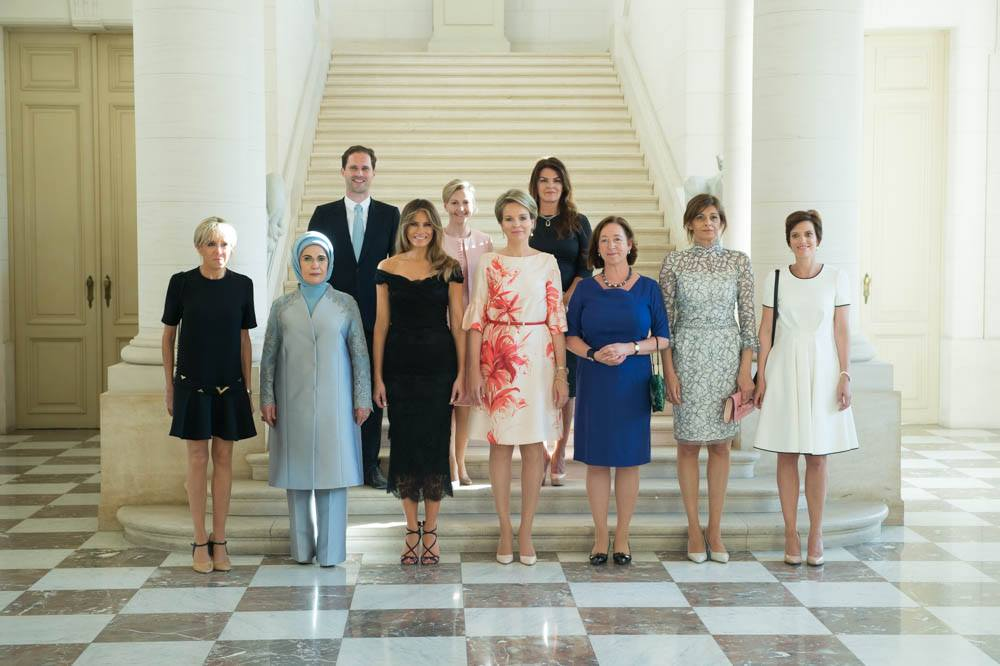
Gauthier Destenay as First Gentleman with Queen Mathilde of Belgium and the First Ladies on the NATO members meeting, Royal Castle of Laeken.

Destenay is from the Belgian Province of Luxembourg and has worked as an associate architect at Belgian-Luxembourgish firm A3 Architecture since 2013. He graduated with a degree in architecture from the University of Liège in 2003.

Destenay has been in a civil union with Bettel since 2010 and appeared along with Bettel at many official events, including the Wedding of Guillaume, Hereditary Grand Duke of Luxembourg, and Countess Stéphanie de Lannoy.

Destenay asked for Bettel's hand in marriage in August 2014. They were married on 15 May 2015 in a private ceremony officiated by Luxembourg city mayor Lydie Polfer in the presence of around 250 guests. Bettel became the first European Union head of government to marry a same-sex partner. The wedding was also attended by Elio Di Rupo, the former Belgian Prime Minister who was the European Union's first openly gay head of government. The ceremony was followed by a reception for 500 guests at the Cercle-Cité.

Destenay gained attention on social media when he appeared as the only male spouse in a group portrait of world leaders' spouses and partners at the 2017 NATO summit. Destenay's name was omitted from the caption of a Facebook photo posted by the White House, even though all the other spouses were correctly labeled. The post was subsequently edited after it led to criticism and accusations of homophobia.
