= Franz Wilhelm Prinz von Preussen =

Prussian prince (born 1943)

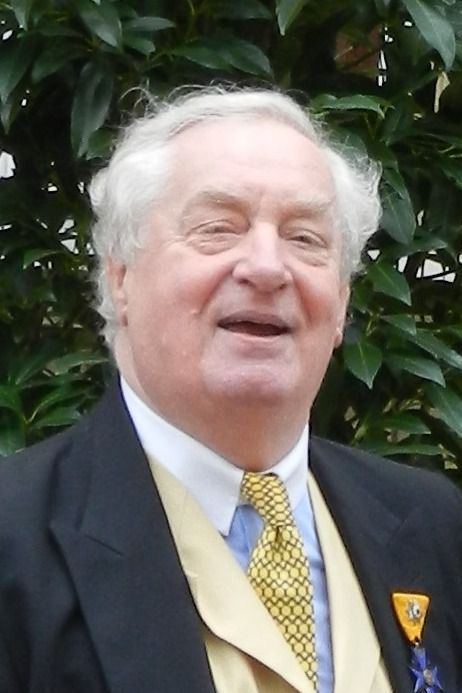
- Franz Wilhelm in 2016
- Born: 3 September 1943 (age 83); Grünberg, Silesia, Nazi Germany (now Poland)
- Spouse: Grand Duchess Maria Vladimirovna of Russia (m. 1976; div. 1985) Nadia Nour El Etreby (m. 2019)
- Issue: Grand Duke George Mikhailovich of Russia
- House: Hohenzollern
- Father: Prince Karl Franz of Prussia
- Mother: Princess Henriette of Schönaich-Carolath

Franz Wilhelm Victor Christoph Stephan Prinz von Preussen (born 3 September 1943) is a German businessman and member of the House of Hohenzollern, the former ruling German imperial house and royal house of Prussia. From 1976 to 1985, he was known as Grand Duke Mikhail Pavlovich of Russia. He is also the great-grandson of German Emperor Wilhelm II.

== Biography ==
Franz Wilhelm Prince of Prussia was born in Grünberg, Silesia, as the son of Prince Karl Franz of Prussia and his first wife Princess Henriette von Schönaich-Carolath. He had a twin brother, Prince Friedrich Christian, who died three weeks after his birth. Prince Franz Wilhelm is a grandson of Prince Joachim of Prussia, the youngest son of Emperor Wilhelm II.

In 2002 Franz Wilhelm with Theodor Tantzen founded the Prinz von Preußen Grundbesitz AG, a project development and project management company which restores old buildings in Germany. In 2004, with financing from a group of investors, he purchased the Royal Porcelain Manufactury Berlin, saving it from insolvency.

== Personal life ==
Franz Wilhelm married his third cousin once removed, Grand Duchess Maria Vladimirovna of Russia, great-great-granddaughter of Queen Victoria, civilly on 4 September 1976 at Dinard and religiously on 22 September at the Russian Orthodox Chapel in Madrid. Before his marriage, he converted to the Russian Orthodox faith and was created a Grand Duke of Russia with the name Mikhail Pavlovich by his father-in-law Grand Duke Vladimir of Russia. Franz Wilhelm and Grand Duchess Maria had one son, Grand Duke George Mikhailovich of Russia (born 13 March 1981), before divorcing on 19 June 1985 (they separated in 1982), at which point he reverted to his previous title. He married Nadia Nour El Etreby (born 2 August 1949) on 14 March 2019, to whom was bestowed upon marriage the courtesy style and title of Her Royal Highness Princess Franz Wilhelm of Prussia.

== Honors and titles ==
=== Honors ===
- Prussian Royal Family: Knight of the Order of the Black Eagle
- House of Romanov: Knight of the Imperial Order of Saint Andrew
- (Kingdom of the Two Sicilies) : House of Bourbon-Two Sicilies: Knight Grand Cross of Justice of the Sacred Military Constantinian Order of Saint George
- : Spain: Protector and Master of Honor of the Cavalry Master of San Fernando

=== Titles ===
- 1943-1976: His Royal Highness Prince Franz Wilhelm of Prussia
- 1976-1985: His Imperial and Royal Highness Grand Duke Mikhail Pavlovich of Russia, Prince of Prussia
- 1985-present: His Royal Highness Prince Franz Wilhelm of Prussia
