= Principality of Reuss-Greiz =

Central German state from 1778 to 1918

Principality of Reuss-Greiz (1778–1848) Fürstentum Reuß-Greiz Principality of Reuss Elder Line (1848–1918) Fürstentum Reuß älterer Linie
- 1778–1918
- Flag Coat of arms
- Motto: Ich bau auf Gott (German for 'I rely on God')
- Anthem: Gott, erhalt in deiner Gnaden unsern Fürsten, deinen Knecht "God, preserve in your grace our prince, your servant"
- Reuss-Greiz within the German Empire

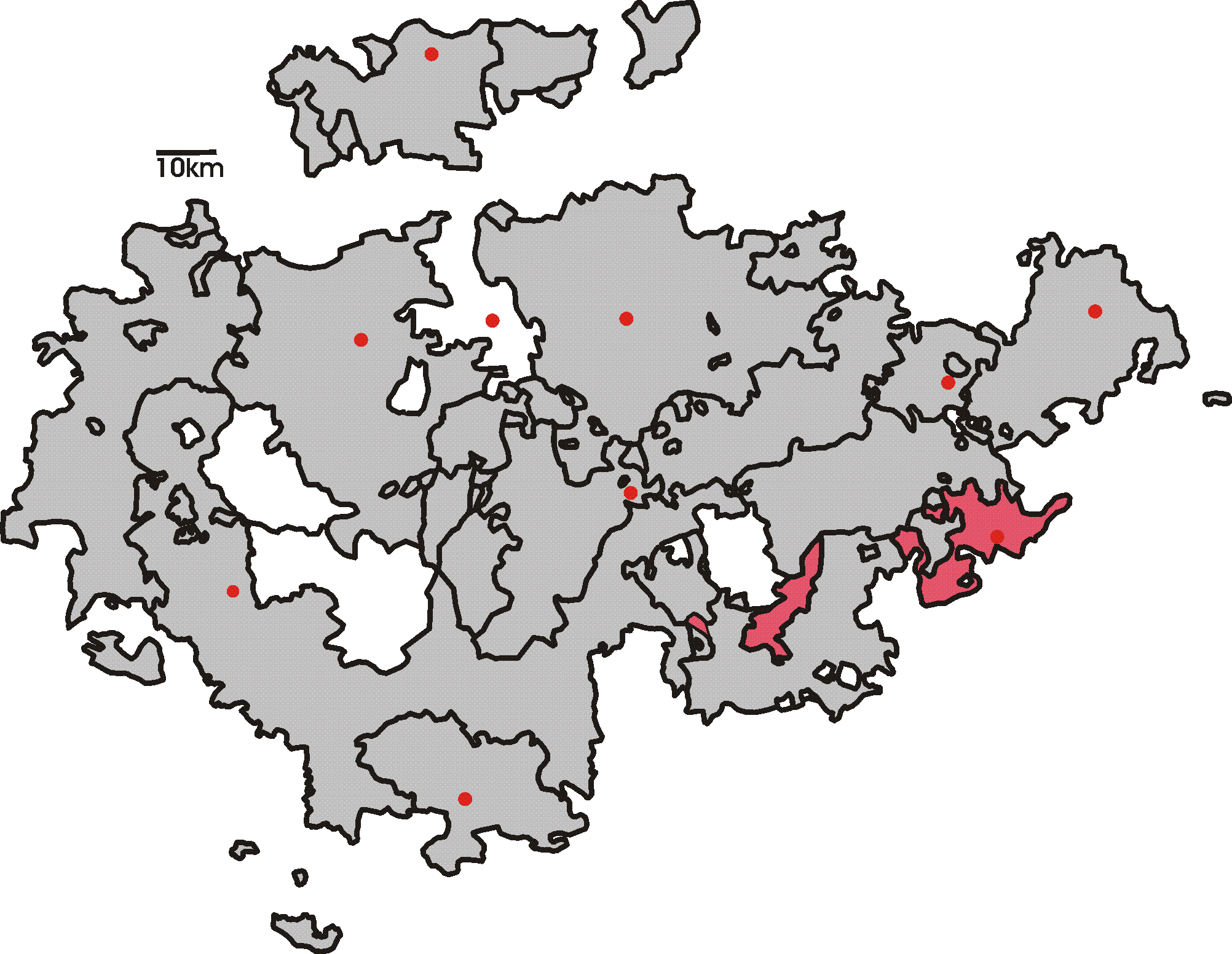
- Reuss-Greiz within Thuringia
- Capital: Greiz
- Government: Principality
- Prince
  - 1778–1800: Heinrich XI
  - 1800–1817: Heinrich XIII
  - 1817–1836: Heinrich XIX
  - 1836–1859: Heinrich XX
  - 1859–1902: Heinrich XXII
  - 1902–1918: Heinrich XXIV
- Minister of State
  - 1782–1833: Franz von Grün (first)
  - 1901–1918: Ernst von Meding (last)
- History
  - Established: 12 May 1778
  - Disestablished: 11 November 1918
Preceded by	Succeeded by
Imperial County of Reuss	People's State of Reuss
- Today part of: Germany

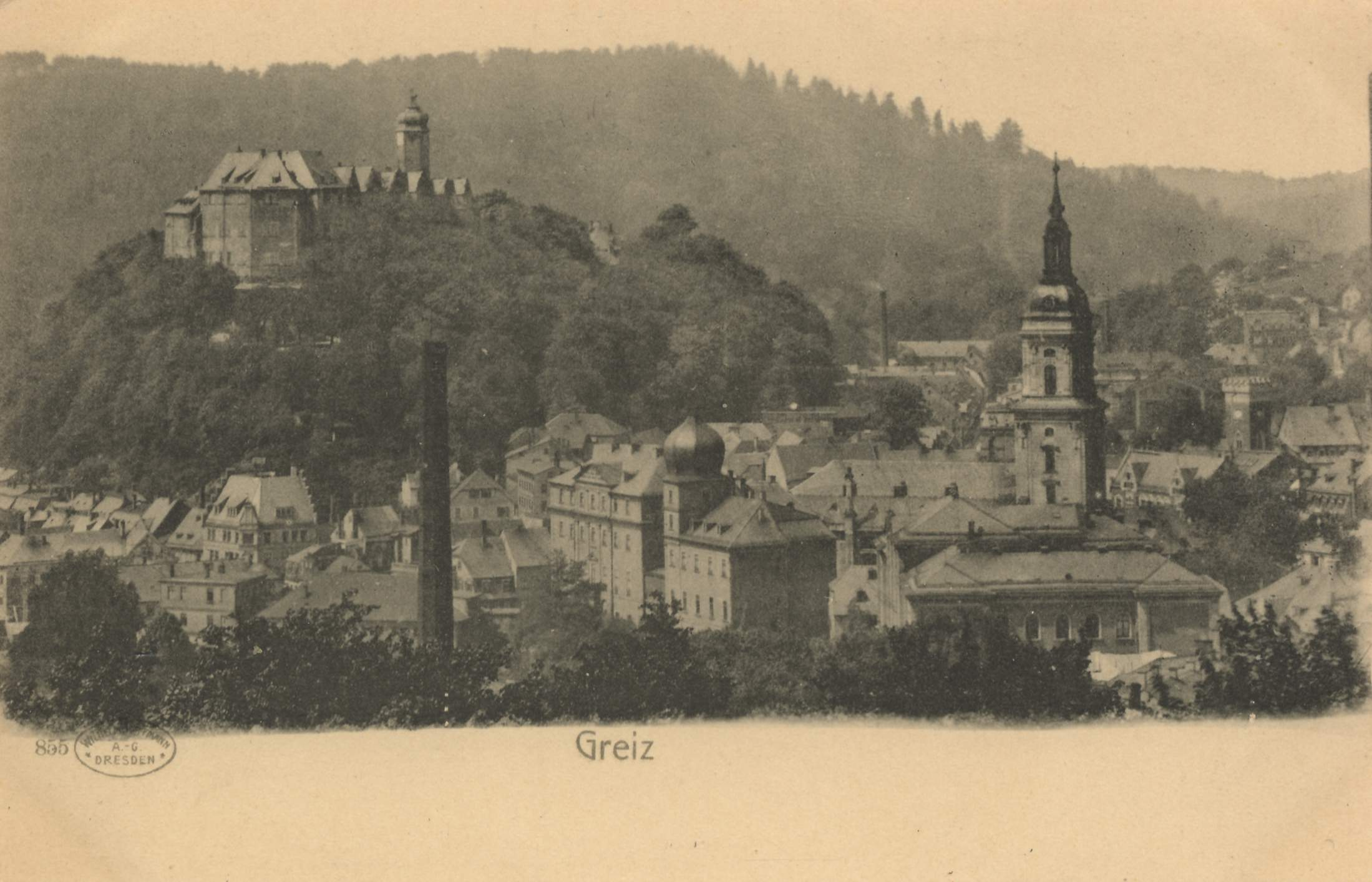
Can see Upper Castle and Lower Castle, Greiz

The Principality of Reuss-Greiz (German: Fürstentum Reuß-Greiz), officially called the Principality of Reuss Elder Line (German: Fürstentum Reuß älterer Linie) after 1848, was a state in the German Empire, ruled by members of the House of Reuss. The Counts Reuss of Greiz, Lower-Greiz and Upper-Greiz (German: Reuß zu Greiz, Untergreiz und Obergreiz) were elevated to princely status in 1778 and thereafter bore the title of Prince Reuss, Elder Line, or Prince Reuss of Greiz.

Similarly to the more numerous Reuss Junior Line, the male members of this house were all named "Heinrich", in honour of Emperor Heinrich VI, who had benefited the family. They were numbered sequentially by birth, rather than by reign, with the last series beginning with Heinrich I (born 1693) and ending with Heinrich XXIV (1878–1927).

The territory had an area of 317 km^{2} and over 72,000 inhabitants in 1910.

Reuss-Greiz preserved the Frankfurt Parliament flag, which later became the flag of Germany.

== Territory ==
In 1919, in the aftermath of World War I, the territory of the Elder Line was merged with that of the Junior Line as the People's State of Reuss, which was incorporated into the new state of Thuringia in 1920. The Elder Line died out in 1927 with the death of the childless Heinrich XXIV, after which its claims were passed to the Junior Line.

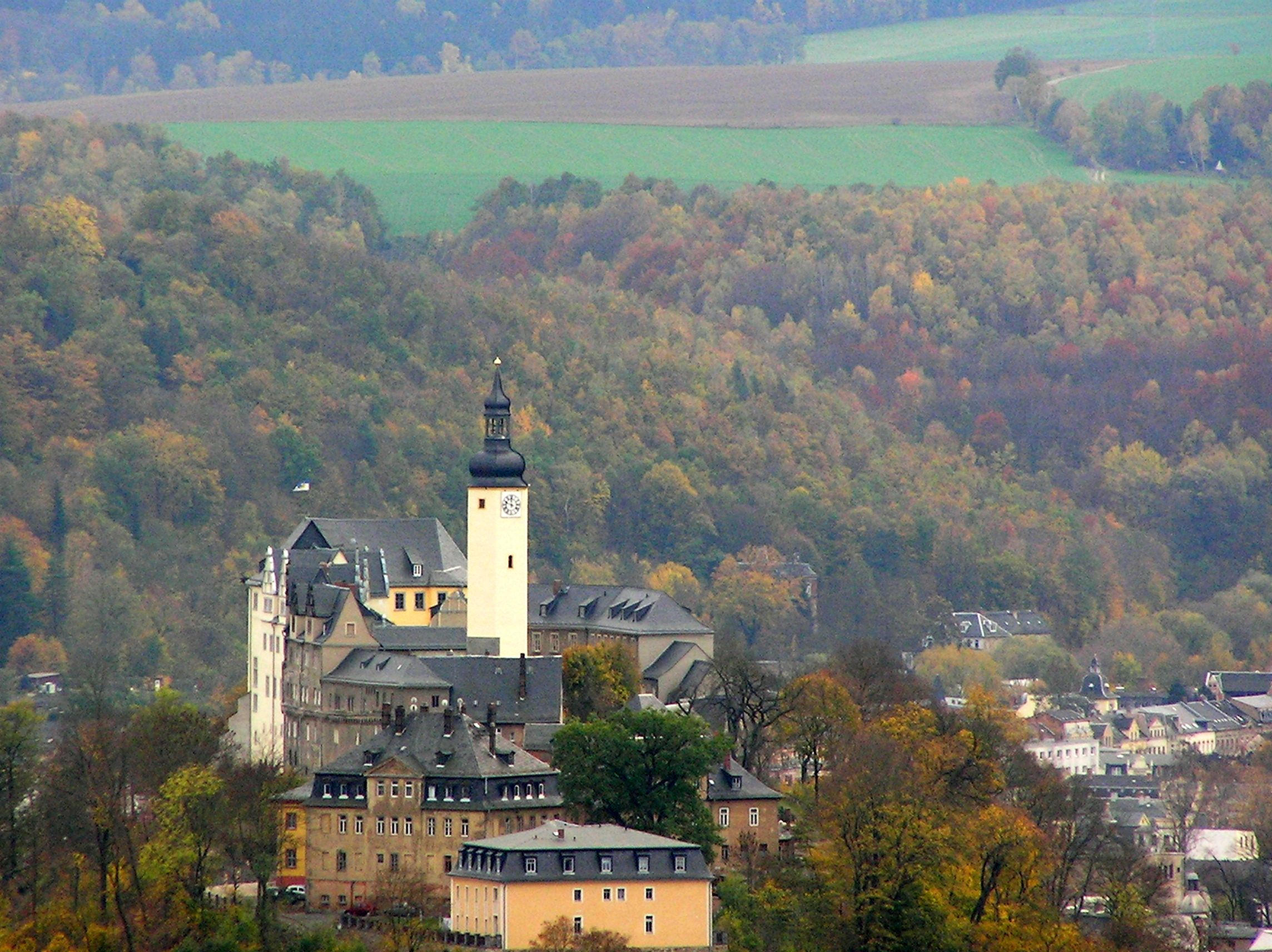
The Upper Castle at Greiz

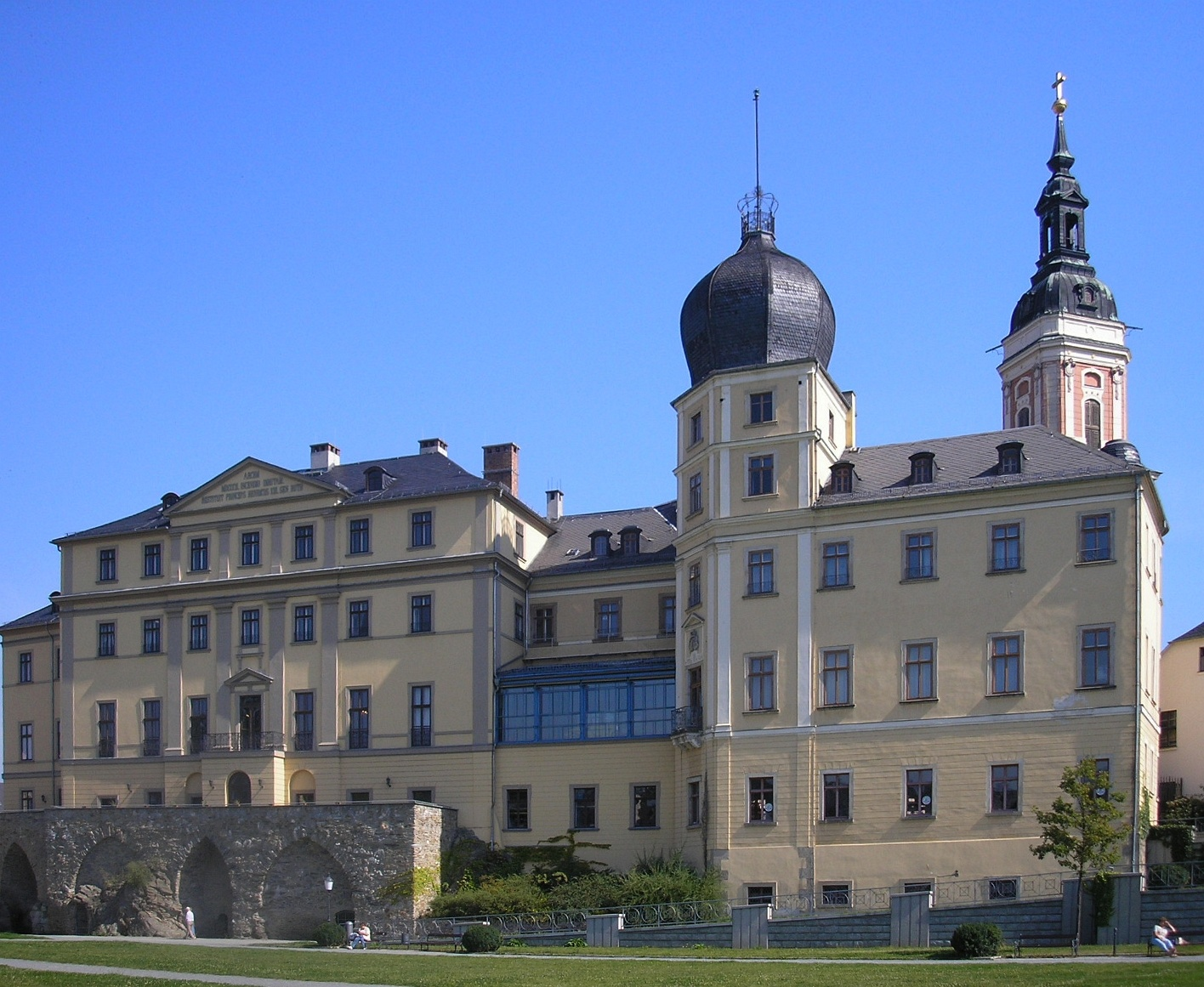
The Lower Castle at Greiz

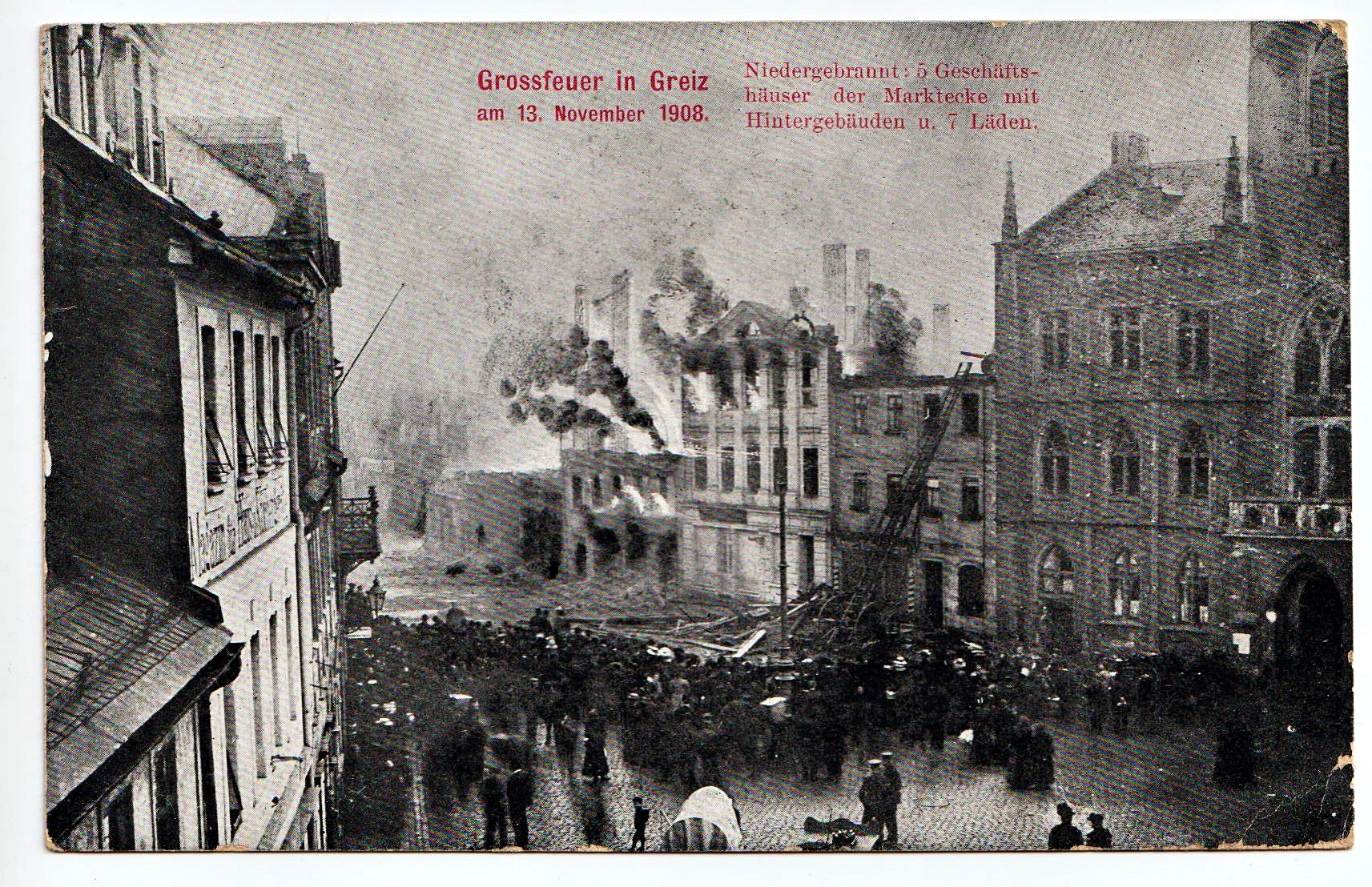
Greiz, major fire, 1908

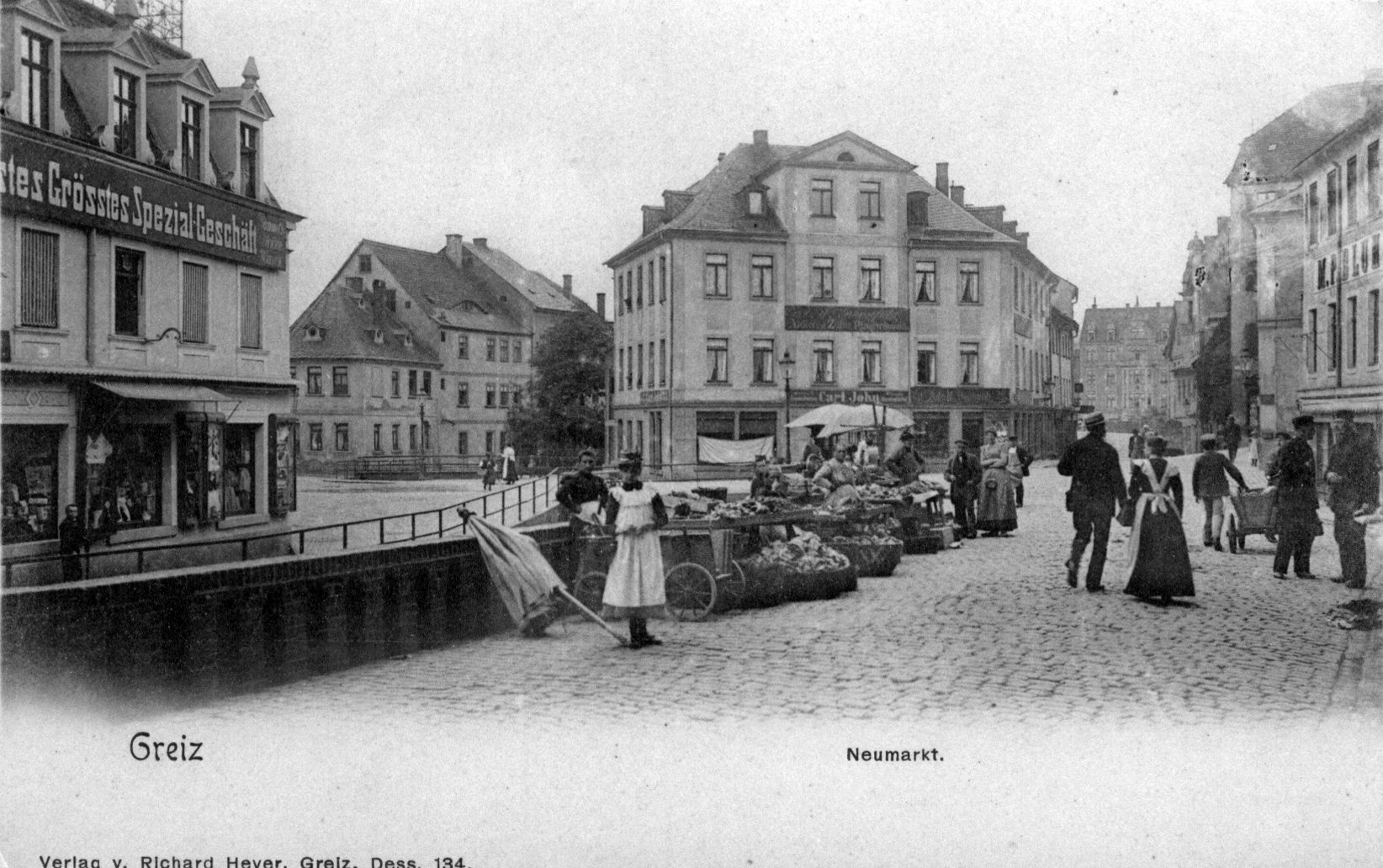
Topfmarkt (today's Puschkinplatz) in Greiz before 1903

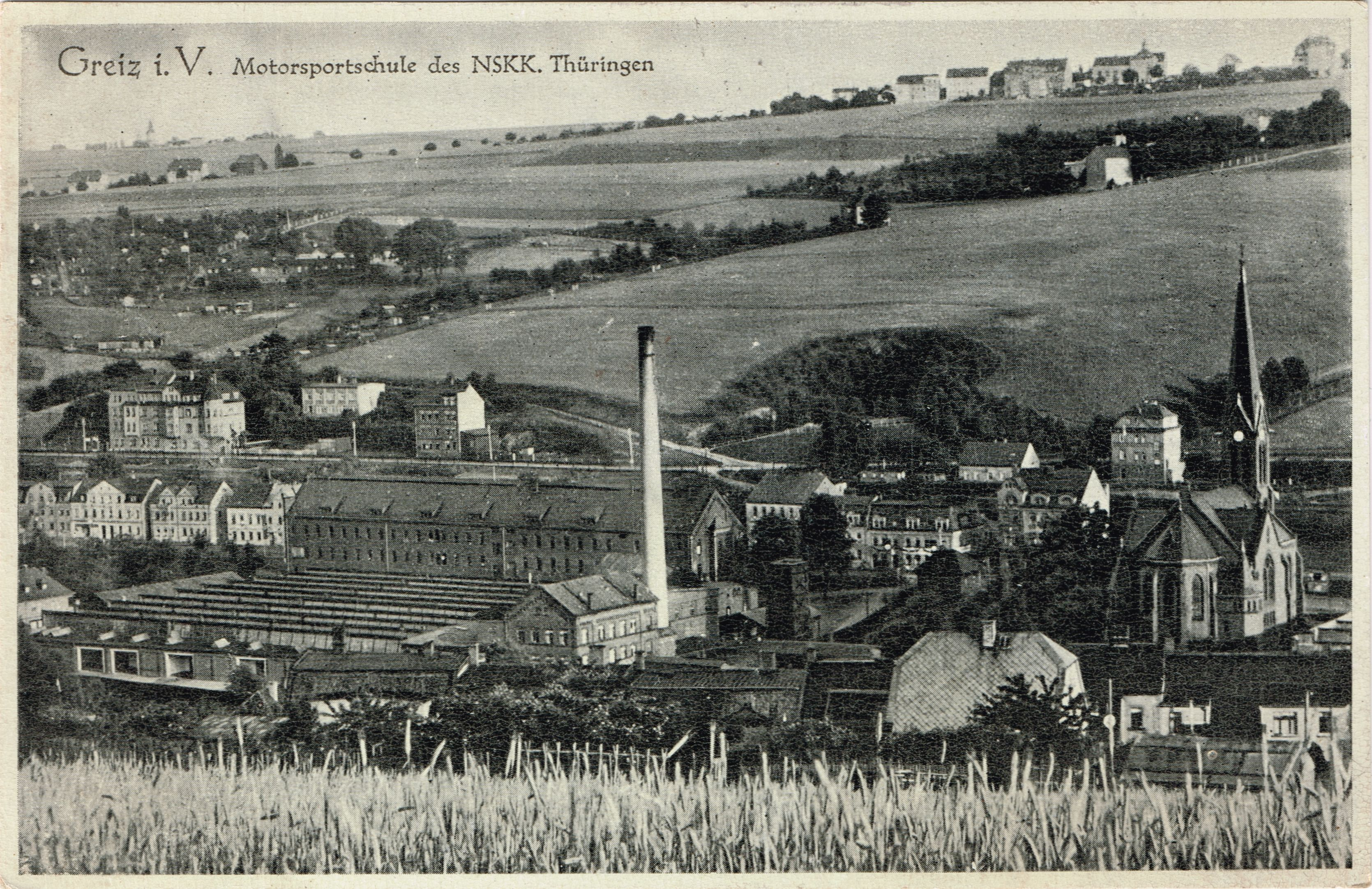
General view of the former company Schilbach & Co., now NSKK

== Notable figures ==
- Princess Hermine Reuss of Greiz, second wife of former German Emperor Wilhelm II
- Princess Caroline Reuss of Greiz, wife of Wilhelm Ernst, Grand Duke of Saxe-Weimar-Eisenach
- Prince Heinrich XV of Reuss-Plauen, Generalfeldmarschall of the Holy Roman Empire

== See also ==
- Flag of Germany, whose modern colors match those of the Reuss-Greiz principality
