= New Palace, Potsdam =

German palace

New Palace
- Neues Palais
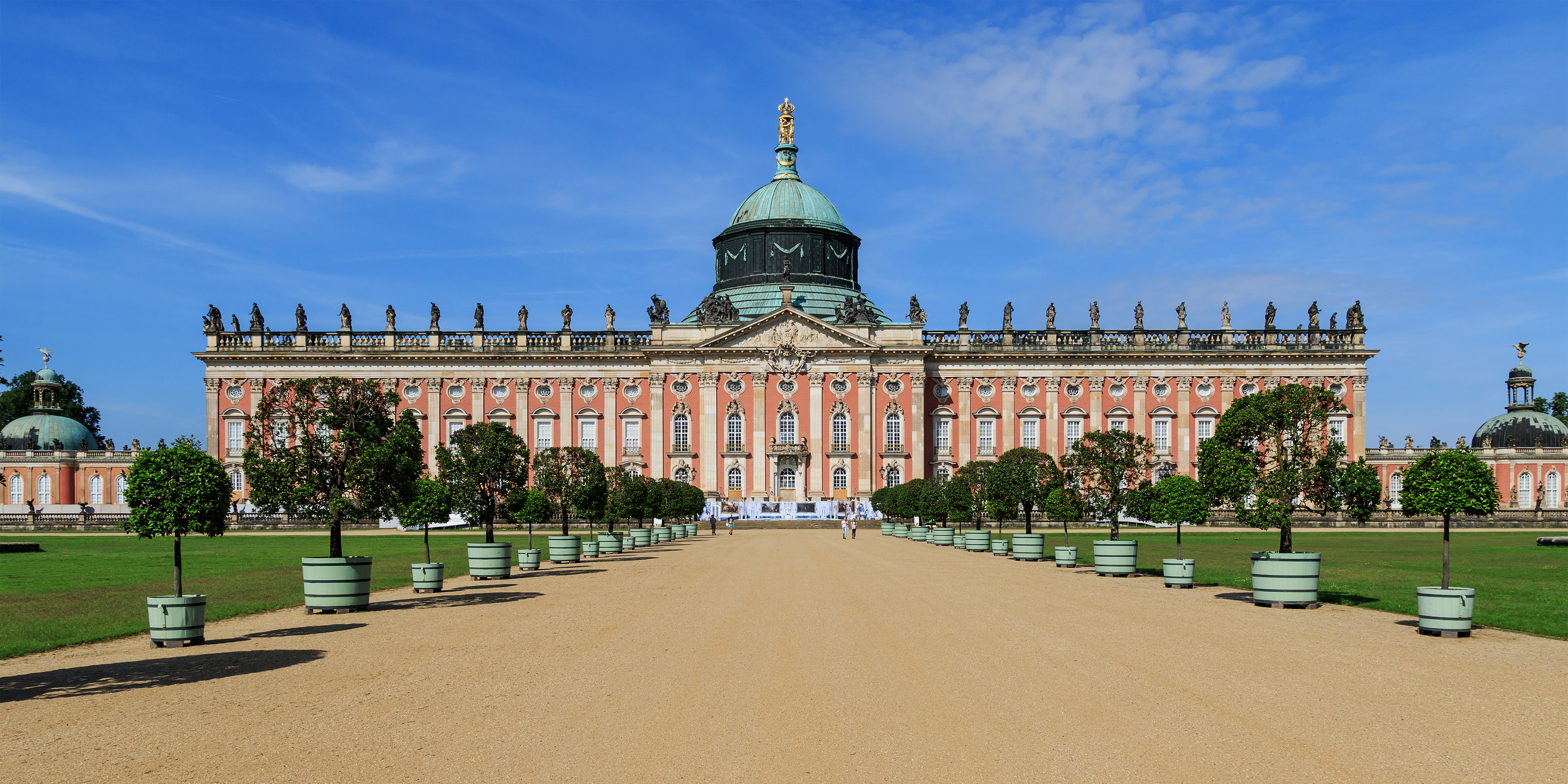
- The New Palace in Sanssouci Park

- Location within Germany Location within Brandenburg

General information
- Type: Palace
- Architectural style: Baroque, Rococo
- Location: Potsdam, Germany
- Coordinates: 52.40°N 13.01°E
- Construction started: 1763
- Completed: 1769
- Client: Frederick the Great
- Owner: Stiftung Preußische Schlösser und Gärten Berlin-Brandenburg

Design and construction
- Architects: Johann Gottfried Büring, Heinrich Ludwig Manger, Carl von Gontard

Website
- www.spsg.de/en/palaces-gardens/object/new-palace/

UNESCO World Heritage Site
- Type: Cultural
- Criteria: I, ii, iv
- Designated: 1990 (14th session)
- Reference no.: 532
- Region: Europe and North America

The New Palace (German: Neues Palais) is a palace situated on the western side of the Sanssouci park in Potsdam, Germany. The building was begun in 1763, after the end of the Seven Years' War, under King Friedrich II (Frederick the Great) and was completed in 1769. It is considered to be the last great Prussian Baroque palace.

== History ==
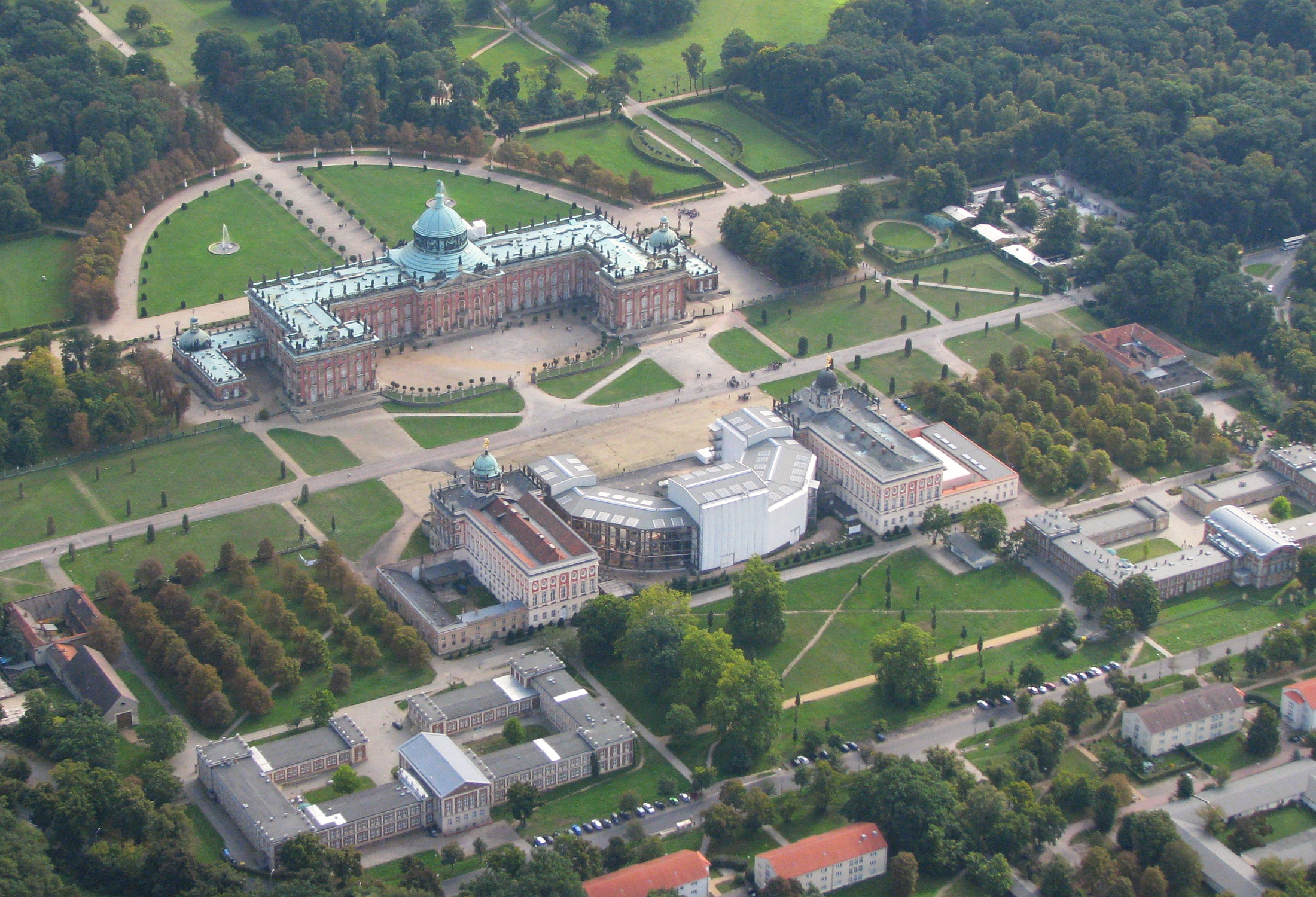
New Palace with the Communs during a renovation (2008)

The building of the palace commenced at the end of the Seven Years' War, to celebrate Prussia's success. The war is also variably referred to as the Third Silesian War, owing to the dispute over Silesia. In an architectural form, Frederick the Great sought to demonstrate the power and glories of Prussia attributing it as fanfaronade, an excess of splendor in marble, stone and gilt.

For the King, the New Palace was not a principal residence, but a display for the reception of important royals and dignitaries. Of the over 200 rooms, four principal gathering rooms and a theater were available for royal functions, balls and state occasions. During his occasional stays at the palace, Frederick occupied a suite of rooms at the southern end of the building, composed of two antechambers, a study, a concert room, a dining salon and a bedroom, among others. While Frederician Rococo was established at Sanssouci, Frederick the Great had the New Palace built in varying forms of Baroque architecture and decoration, with some deviations. The King preferred Rococo and Baroque to the Neoclassical style that was already taking hold of Europe at the time as the preference of many monarchs. Architect Johann Gottfried Büring, with the aid of Heinrich Ludwig Manger, was assigned with the task of planning the New Palace and had already demonstrated success with the completion of the Chinese Teahouse and the Picture Gallery in the Sanssouci royal park. After disagreements over the design of the palace, in 1764 the design of the palace was totally vested in the architect Carl von Gontard. The three-story façade had already begun to rise around unfinished interiors, as construction had steadily been underway, with 220 metre east and west façades. Between the pilasters, what appears to be brick is actually a painted effect, leaving only the King's south wing with exposed brick. Repointing the mortar of the joints proved to be an arduous and expensive task, therefore Frederick had the brick covered in stucco and painted in such a way that even tourists today are fooled by the deceptive finish. Over 400 sandstone statues and figures adorn the palace and auxiliary buildings, created by many notable sculptors, namely Johann Peter Benckert, Johann Matthias Gottlieb Heymüller, the brothers Johann David and Johann Lorenz Räntz and others.

After the death of Frederick the Great in 1786, the New Palace fell into disuse and was rarely occupied as a residence or entertainment venue. However, starting in 1859 it became the summer residence of the German Crown Prince, Frederick William, later German Emperor Frederick III. The palace was the preferred residence of Frederick and his empress, Victoria, throughout the 99 Days’ Reign. During the short reign of Frederick III, the palace was renamed "Friedrichskron Palace" (Schloss Friedrichskron) and a moat was dug around the palace. The accession of Wilhelm II saw renovation and restoration within the palace being carried out with the installation of steam heating, bathrooms in state apartments and electrification of the chandeliers which Frederick the Great had collected from across Europe. In 1890 the so-called "Tip of Mount Kilimanjaro" was installed in the Grotto Room, after German geographer Hans Meyer gifted it to Kaiser Wilhelm II. Until 1918, the palace remained the preferred residence of Wilhelm II and the Empress Augusta Viktoria.

After the November Revolution and the abdication of Wilhelm II, the New Palace became a museum and remained such until the Second World War. Some of the palace's treasures were looted by the Soviet Army at the end of the war. Much of its furniture had been removed and taken to the residence of the exiled Wilhelm II at Huis Doorn in the Netherlands. The majority of the furnishings were discovered by the Dutch in the 1970s, still in their original packing crates, and returned to Potsdam. Because of this, and because it escaped bombing in the Second World War, the palace today looks much as it did in 1918.

In recent years the palace's owner, the Prussian Palaces and Gardens Foundation Berlin-Brandenburg, has commemorated the palace's Nazi links with labelled chairs (see photo). It notes that "(Hermann) Göring specifically chose the New Palace as a prestigious meeting location for his new State Council in 1933. He clearly and symbolically intended to claim the legacy of King Frederick II – 'the Great' ‒ for himself."

== Architecture ==
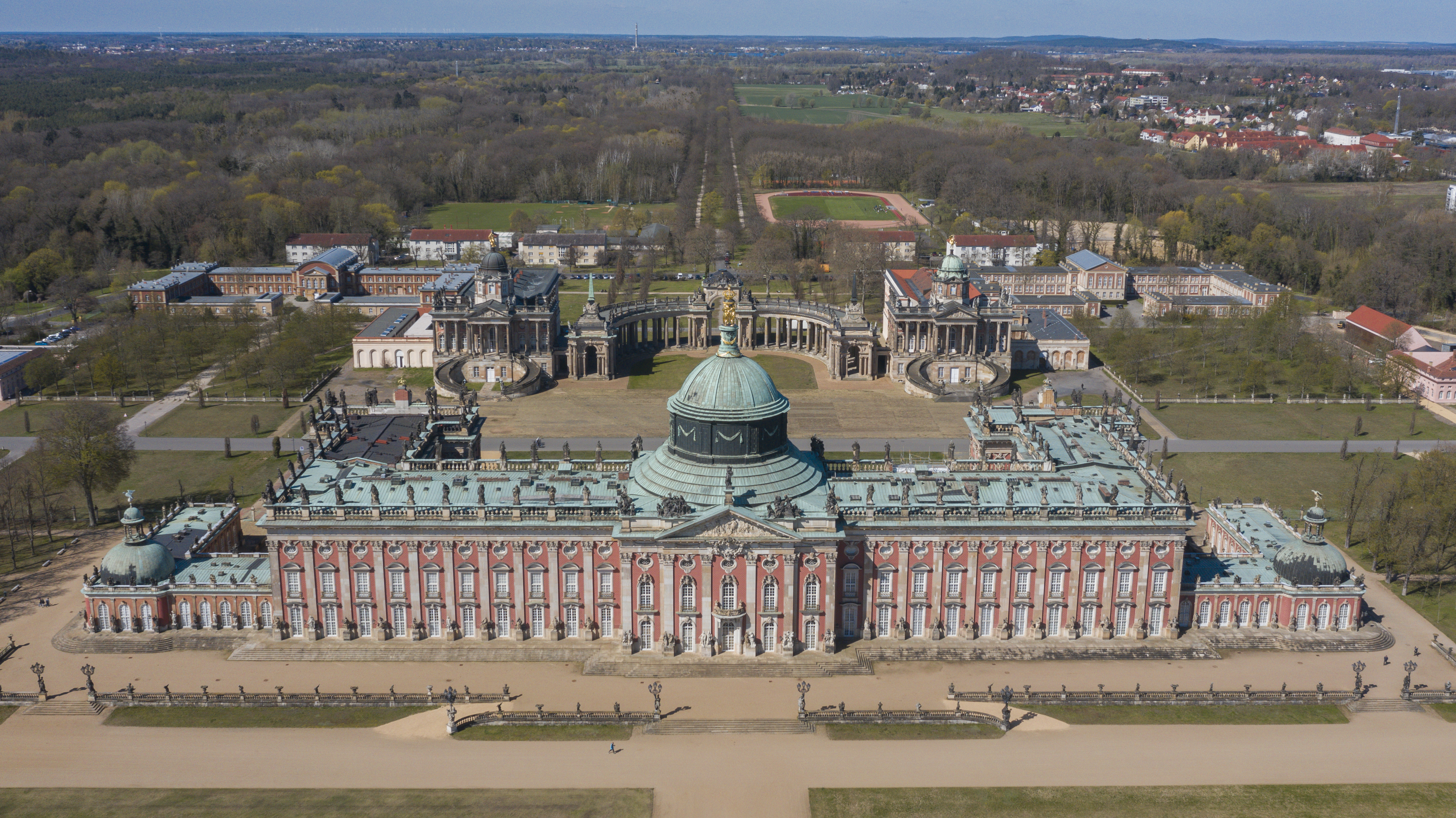
Aerial view of the New Palace

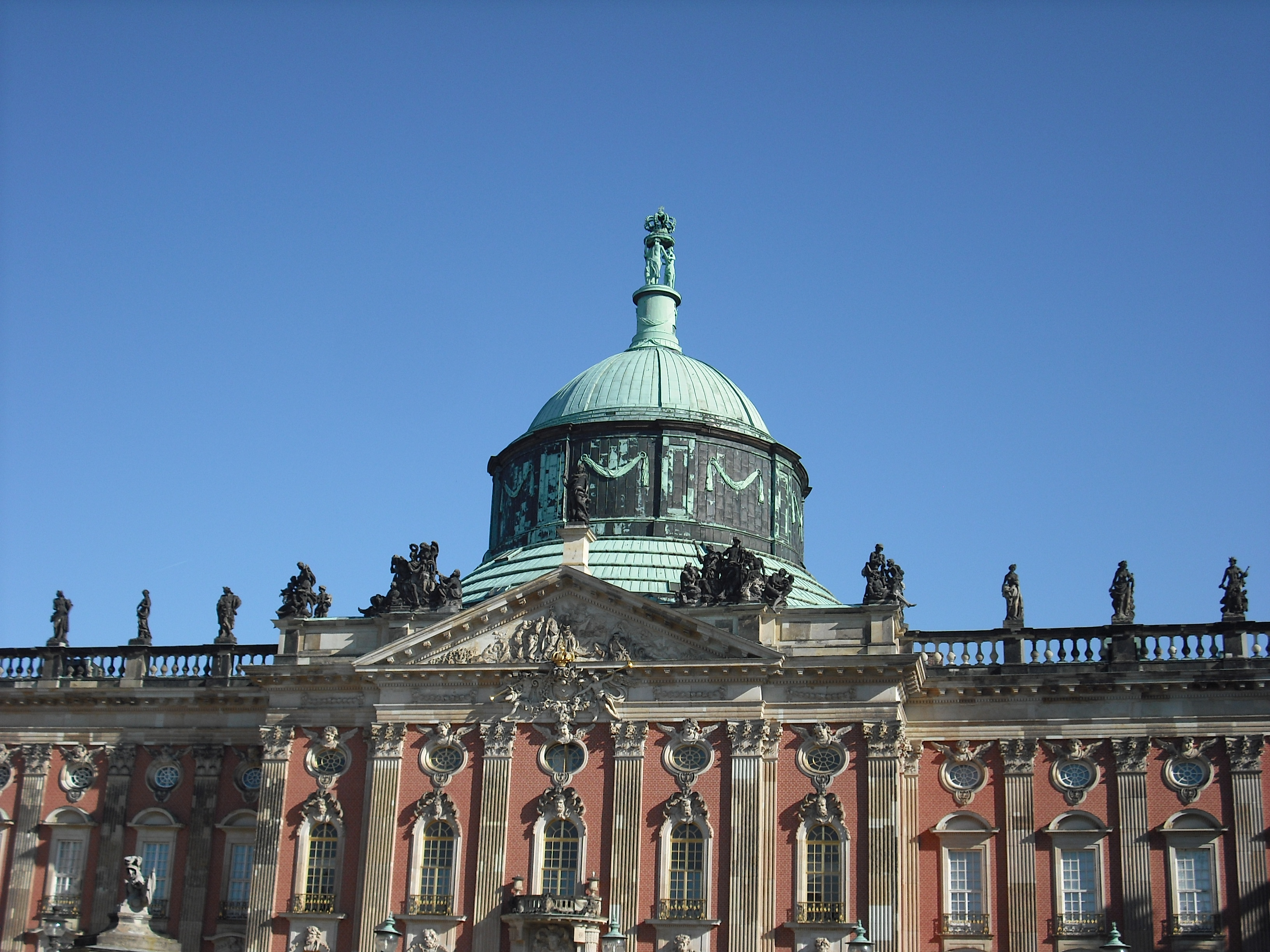
New Palace, from the west side.

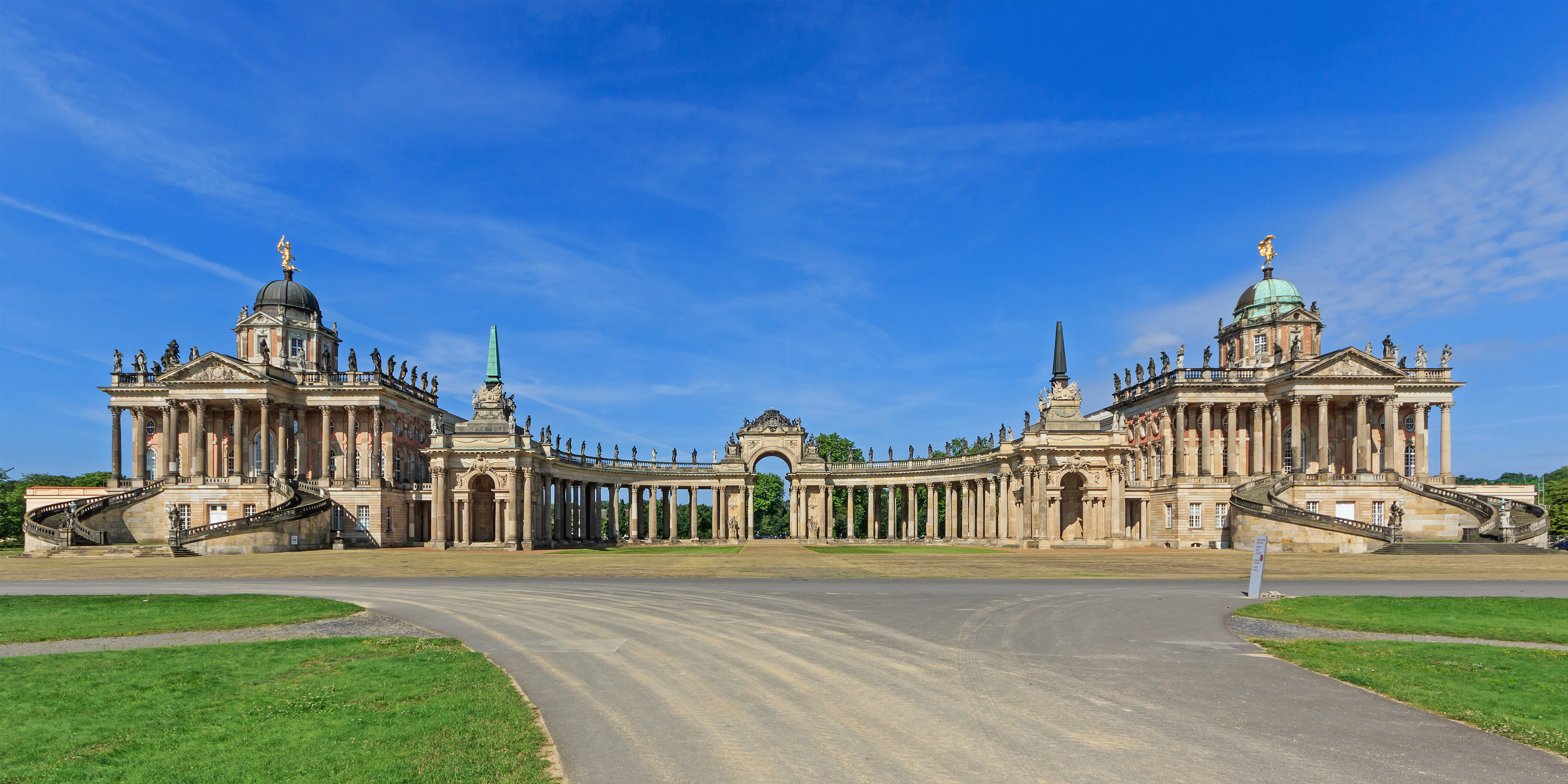
The Communs

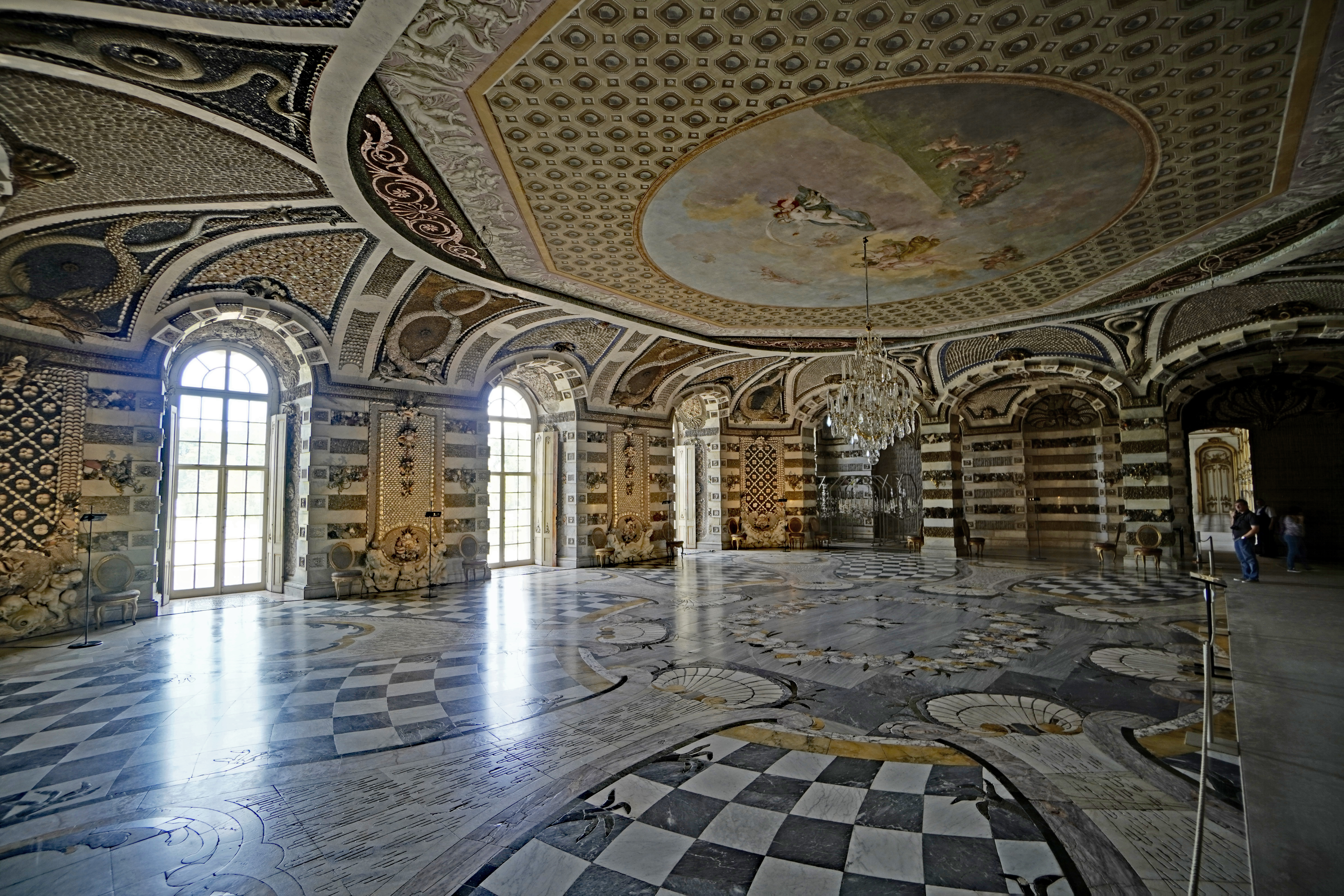
Grotto Hall (Grottensaal)

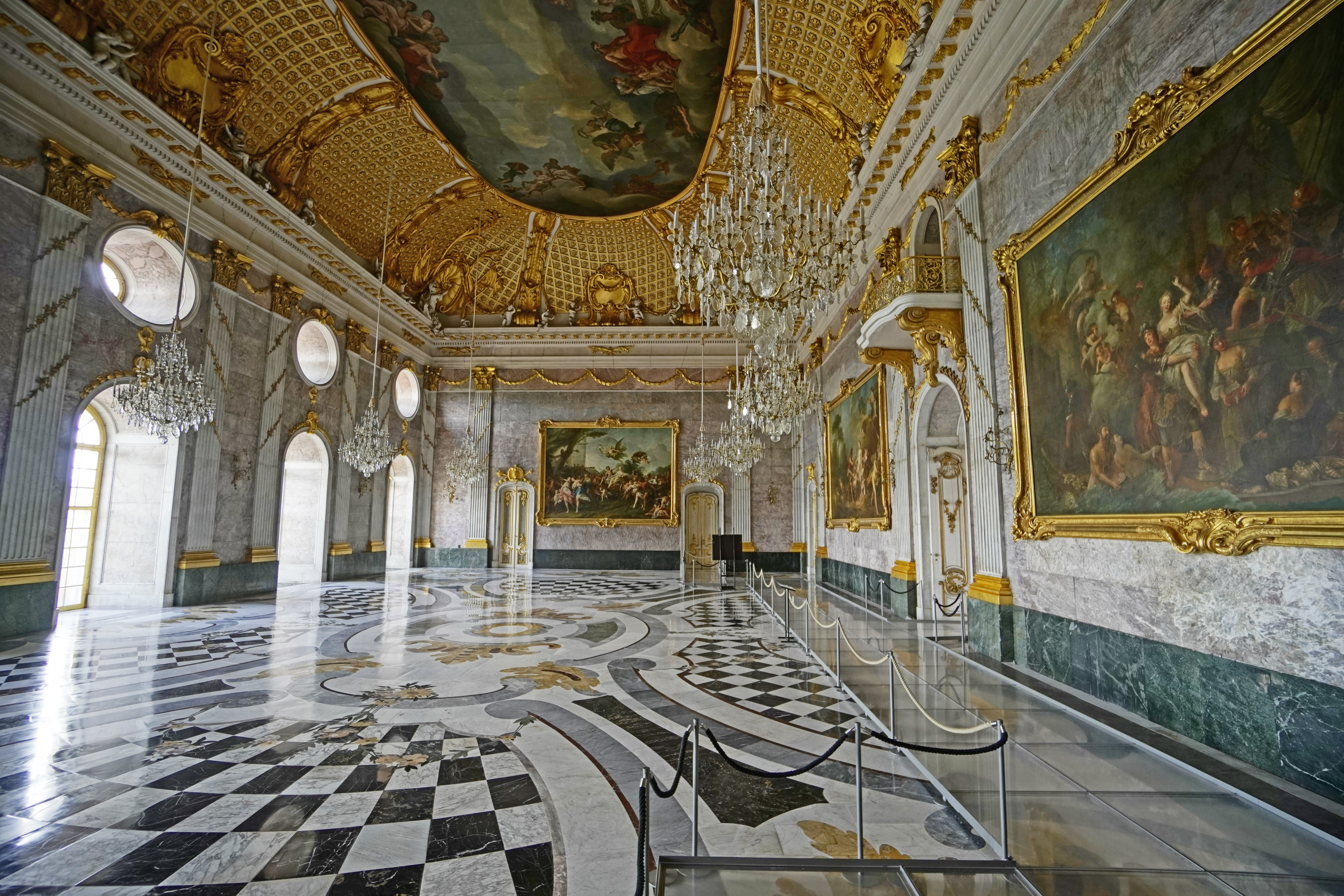
Marble Hall (Marmorsaal)

The New Palace was built as a summer residence for the royal family between 1763 and 1769 using four architects: Johann Gottfried Büring, Heinrich Ludwig Manger, Carl von Gontard, and Jean-Laurent Legeay. Using a Baroque symmetrical layout, the three-wing palace, with side extensions, faces the Communs service wing, consisting of two wings connected by a colonnade. The Communs act as a counterpart to the New Palace, acting as a stage set with double flights of steps, though it contains domestic quarters and the kitchens. The main palace building is crowned by a dome with the Three Graces holding the crown of Prussia. The adjoining wings have matching gilded eagle crowned cupolas. At the center of the building are two banqueting halls on the ground floor and another two on the first, with royal apartments adjoining, including anteroom painting galleries. Instead of a main staircase, four small staircases give access to the apartments. A vestibule serves as the central entrance from the courtyard, with a ceiling painting of Apollo by Johann Christoph Frisch.

On the ground floor behind the vestibule is the Grotto Hall, attributed to Carl von Gontard, with walls encrusted with shells, stones, marble, quartz and semi-precious stones, which were enriched in the 19th century. Part of the design of the Groto Hall is a marble floor depicting marine animals and plants and an 1806 ceiling painting, Venus and Amor, the Three Graces and Putti. Attributed to Johann Gottfried Niedlich, the painting has replaced an earlier work. Niches around the room contain statuary and fountains, with cut crystal chandeliers hung in the arches.

The Marmorgalerie adjoins the Grotto Room, containing red jasper and white marble from Carrara. Large mirrors face the windows, while the three-part ceiling painting by Christian Bernhard Rode depicts morning, noon, and night.

Situated directly over the Grotto Hall is the Marble Hall, the largest of the festival halls, which was used variously as a ballroom and as a banqueting hall. Rising over two floors, the hall overlooks the eastern parterres and the axial vista leading to Sanssouci. The richly gilt, curved ceiling rises into the attic area under the great copper dome. The painting in the center of this ceiling, The Induction of Ganymede in Olympus, was created in 1769 by Charles-Amédée-Philippe van Loo. With a surface of 240 square meters, it is the largest canvas ceiling painting north of the Alps. Four enormous paintings commissioned before the Seven Years' War adorn the marble walls of the hall. Positioned at the pilasters are twelve statues, depicting eight Brandenburg Prince-electors and four famous "emperors": Julius Caesar, Constantine, Charlemagne and Rudolph II. A balcony with an intricate gilt iron railing overlooks the hall from the third floor.

The Upper Gallery within the palace is situated to the south of the Marble Hall and is directly above the Marble Gallery on the ground floor. The ceiling is painted in hues of rose, antique yellow and white, accented with heavy gilt ornamentation. The ever-popular Neoclassicism of Europe at the time can be seen in the roundels positioned above and on the doors. Six large Italian Baroque paintings hang opposite the windows of the gallery. All that remains of the original furnishings are three marble mosaic console tables and upholstered settees.

The theatre located in the south wing was designed by Johann Christian Hoppenhaupt. The stage is framed by gilt palm trees, with Thalia and Melpomene above, holding a plaque with Frederick's initials. The theatre lacks a royal box in which a king may view a performance. Instead, Frederick would sit among his guests in the third row of seating from the stage. The semi-circular seat rows ascend as in a classical amphitheatre. The theatre opened on 18 July 1768 with an oratorio by Johann Adolf Hasse. The theatre remains in current use.

After the revolution of 1918, which overthrew the monarchy, the Weimar Republic allowed 34 train wagons of furniture from the palace to be sent to the exiled Wilhelm II at Huis Doorn in the Netherlands. This is the reason why the furniture in the upper rooms formerly lived in by Wilhelm II and his consort Empress Augusta Viktoria comes from elsewhere.

== Park ==
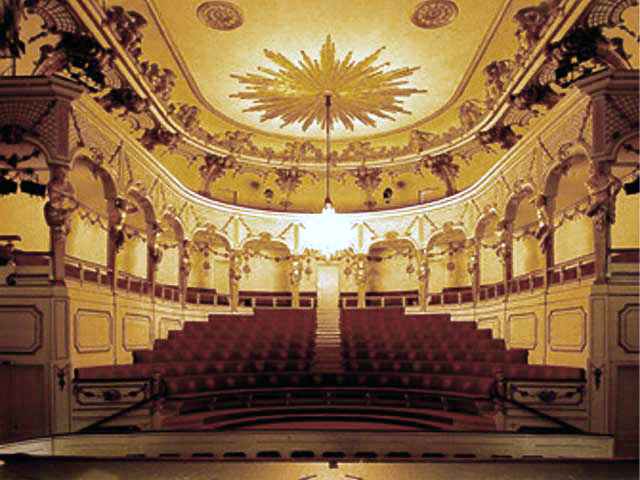
Theatre

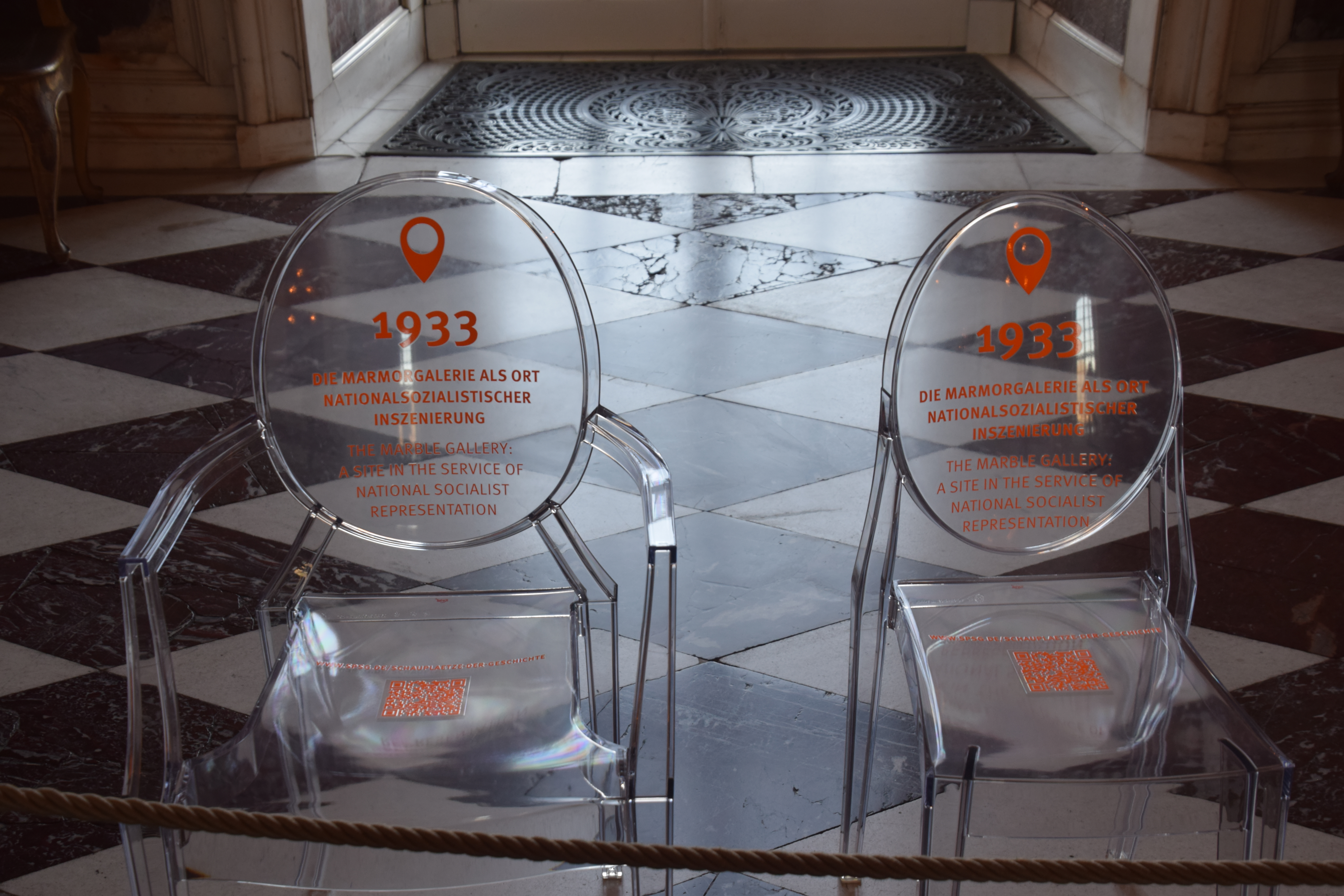
Commemoration of Nazi links in 2022 in the Marble Gallery.

The New Palace, lying at the western end of the Sanssouci royal park, is located on a main axial avenue. At the time of its construction, the palace was located in an expansive baroque park area. Today, the area of the palace park within proximity to the New Palace is laid out simply with pathways, statuary, fountains and greenery.

Nearby are the Temple of Friendship and the Antique Temple, which like the New Palace were designed by Carl von Gontard and built shortly after its completion.

== World Heritage Site ==
Since 1990, the New Palace has been part of the UNESCO World Heritage Site "Palaces and Parks of Potsdam and Berlin". The palace is administered by the Stiftung Preußische Schlösser und Gärten Berlin-Brandenburg.

== See also ==
- List of castles in Berlin and Brandenburg
- Palaces and Parks of Potsdam and Berlin
- List of Baroque residences
- List of sights of Potsdam
