= Eight Corners =

Coordinates: 52°23′46″N 13°03′31″E

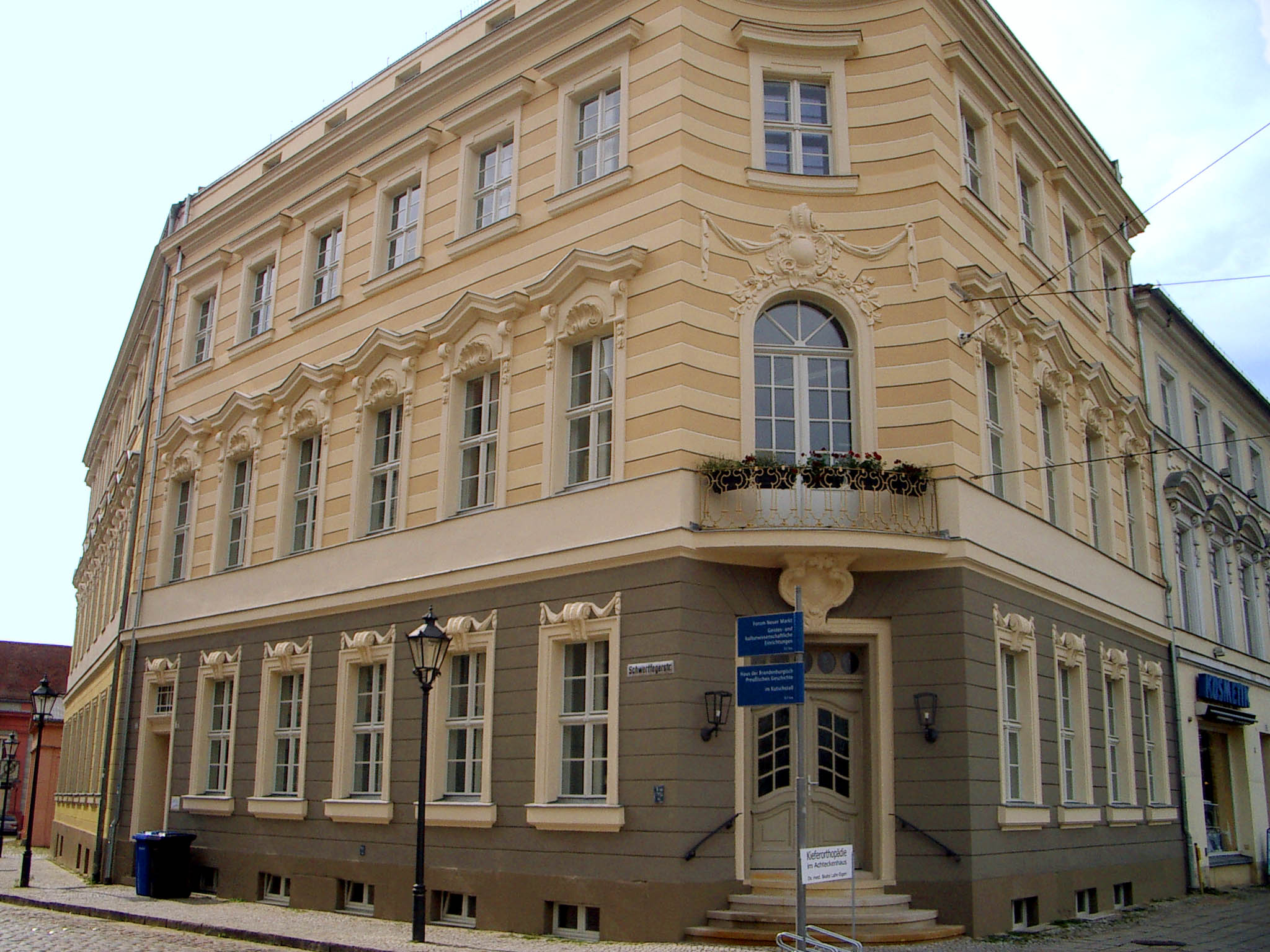
Remaining house from the Eight Corners

Acht Ecken (Eight Corners) is the name of a former architectural ensemble in Potsdam, Germany.

At the intersection of Schwertfegerstraße and Friedrich-Ebert-Straße, four identical baroque houses were built on the corner plots in 1771 by Bayreuth architect Carl von Gontard. Each building was designed with a concave facade towards the crossroads, resulting in eight corners in total.

Today, only one of the four buildings is left. Friedrich-Ebert-Straße was turned into a wide traffic artery after World War II destructions, occupying the two eastern building sites. The southwestern property was rebuilt with a modern prefab concrete building in the 1960s.

== See also ==
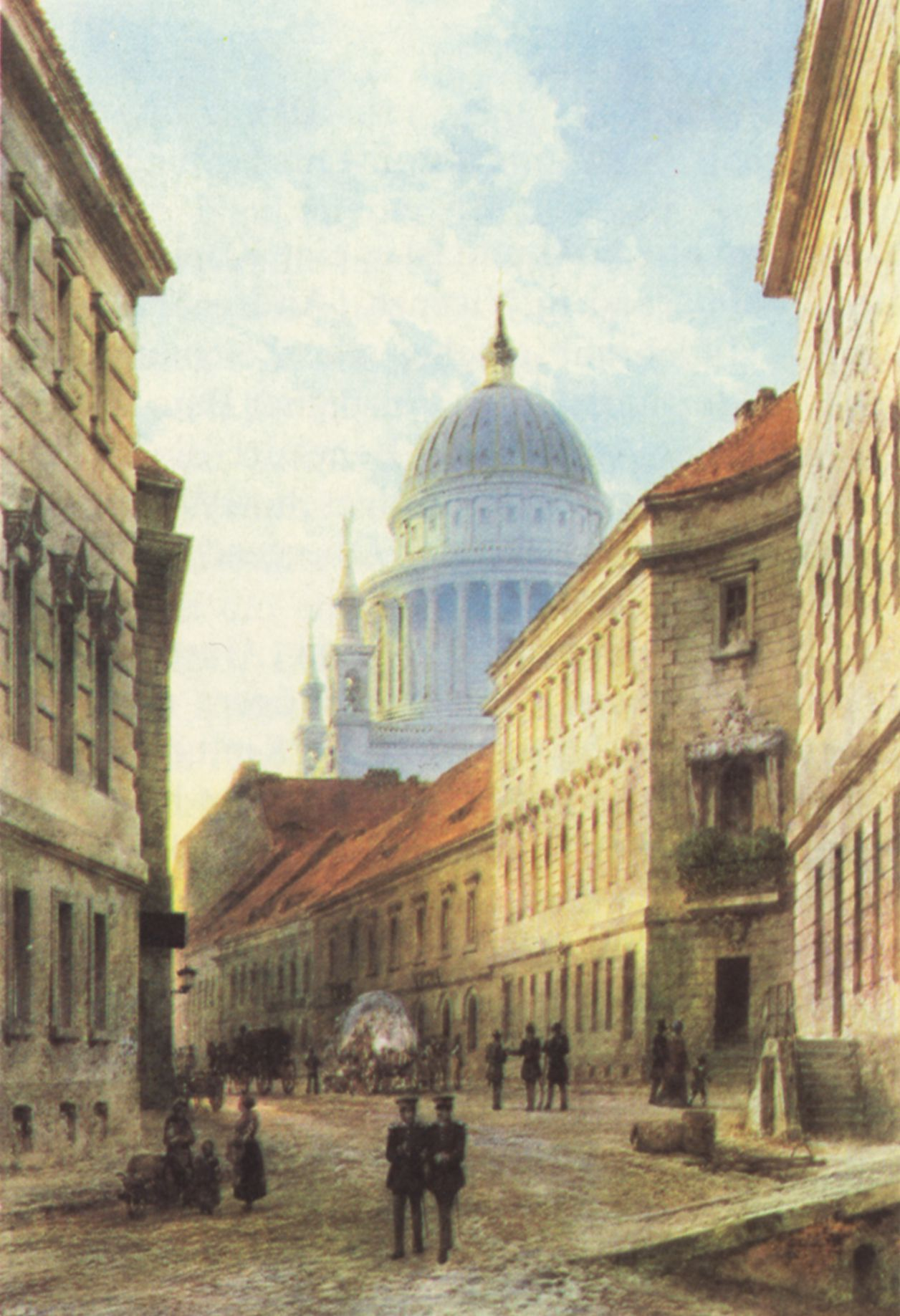
1850

- Royal country house (Potsdam)
- Quattro Canti (four corners), a similar composition in Palermo, Italy.
