= Georg Christian Unger =

German architect

Georg Christian Unger (25 May 1743 – 20 February 1799) was a German architect who was a pupil of the architect Carl von Gontard and served Frederick II of Prussia. Among his works were the Brandenburg Gate in Potsdam and the Gendarmenmarkt in Berlin.
