= Peter and Paul Church, Potsdam =

Church in Potsdam, Germany

- St. Peter und Paul-Kirche
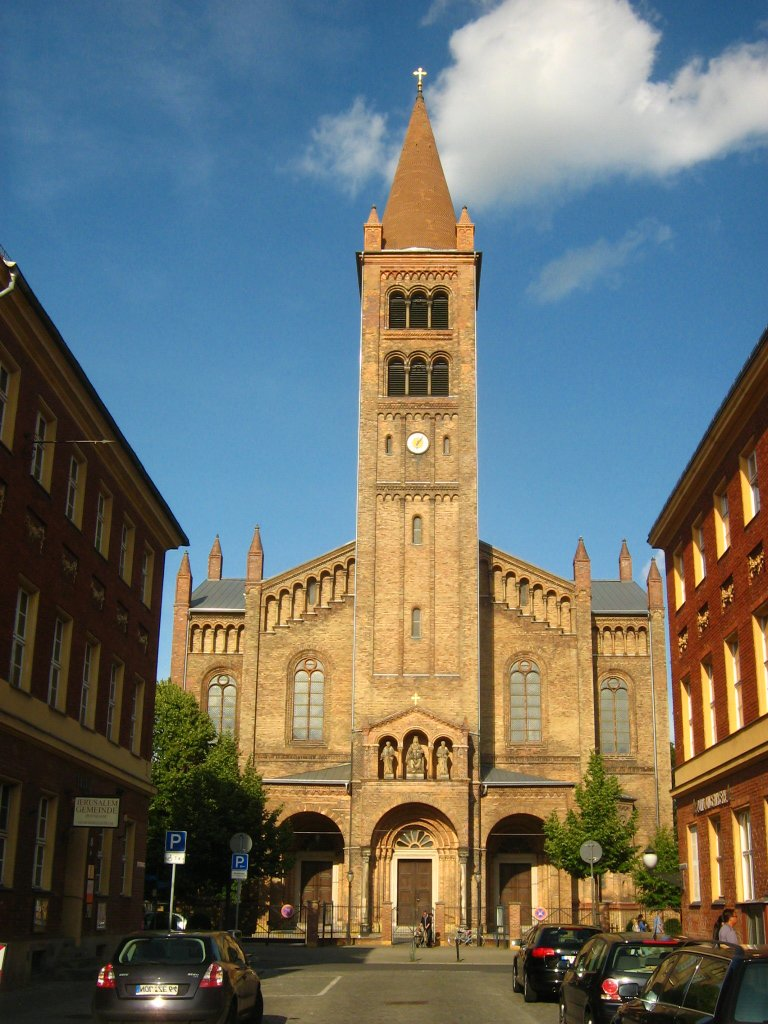

- 52.401°N 13.060°E
- Location: Potsdam
- Country: Germany
- Denomination: Catholic Church
- Website: https://www.peter-paul-kirche.de/potsdam

Architecture
- Completed: 1870

The Church of St. Peter and Paul is a Roman Catholic church located in the centre of Potsdam, Germany. It sits at the eastern end of Brandenburger Street, at the western end of which is the Potsdamer Brandenburger Gate. The present church building was completed in 1870 and served the Potsdam parishioners (now part of the Archdiocese of Berlin) and the Catholic soldiers who were stationed in the city. Since 1992 it has had the status of a provost church.

== See also ==
- Day of Potsdam
