= Royal Country House (Potsdam) =

Coordinates: 52°24′39.53″N 13°03′26.11″E

The Royal Country House in Potsdam is situated on mount Kapellenberg and was originally constructed for the sexton of the Russian Orthodox chapel of Saint Alexander Nevsky nearby. The façade of the log house recalls simple German and Russian farm constructions. It was used as a royal residence. On the second floor, King Frederik William III would give tea parties, sometimes gathering up to 40 persons. Only a samovar from Tula and table and tea services produced by the Berlin royal porcelain manufactory specified the high position of the dweller. A porcelain service, gift of the Russian emperor Nicholas I, was decorated with painted gold on a malachite background, and scenes of rural life. Since Frederik William's era there has been a tiny monument to Tsar Alexander I, one meter in height.

== See also ==
- Eight Corners (Potsdam)
