= Antique Temple =

Temple in Potsdam, Germany

Coordinates: 52°24′08″N 13°01′07″E

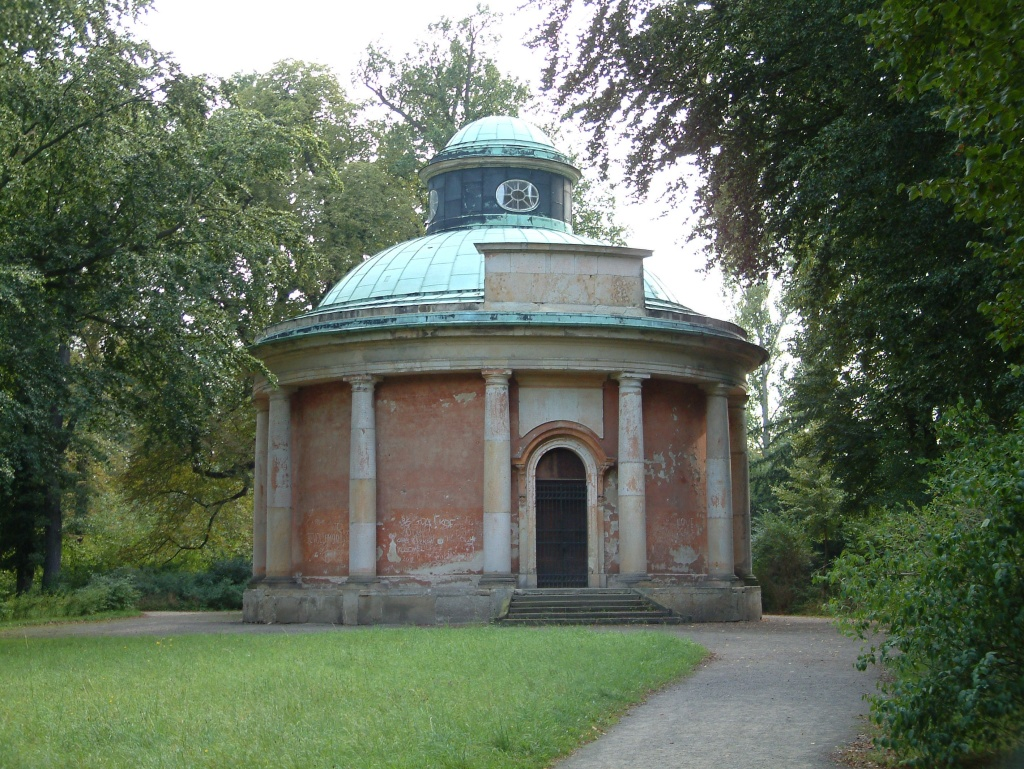
The Antique Temple in Sanssouci Park

The Antique Temple is a small round temple in the west part of Sanssouci Park in Potsdam. Frederick the Great had the building constructed to house his collection of classical works of art, antique artifacts, coins and antique gems. Carl von Gontard created the building in 1768/69 near the New Palace north of the Central Alley, as a complement to the Temple of Friendship situated south of the Alley. Since 1921 the Antique Temple has been used as a mausoleum for members of the House of Hohenzollern and is not open to the public.

== Usage under Frederick the Great ==
The Antique Temple was, like the Sanssouci Picture Gallery, envisioned from the beginning as a museum and at the time of Frederick the Great could be visited after notifying the castellan at the New Palace. Next to dozens of antique ornaments, such as marble urns, bronze figurines, tools, weights and ceramics, could be found the so-called 'Family of Lycomedes', ten life-sized marble statues on marble plinths. They came to Frederick the Great from the art collection of the French Cardinal Melchior de Polignac. Fifty busts of marble, basalt and bronze sat on brackets, 31 of which also came from Polignac's collection; the rest were from Friedrich's favourite sister, Princess Wilhelmine, Margravine of Brandenburg-Bayreuth. In a square annex that could only be reached by opening a door from the round central hall, the Coin Chamber was created. Four cedar wood cupboards were filled with over 9,200 gold, silver and bronze coins, around 4,370 engraved gems and cameos, 48 marble, terra cotta and bronze reliefs, and books from Frederick the Great's archaeological library.

== New usage under Frederick William III ==
Frederick William III, who ruled Prussia from 1797, announced in a Cabinet Order on 1 September 1798:

"...for the progress of the study of the antiquities and art... the collection of medals and antiques in the Antique Temple in Potsdam shall be united with the similar collections in Berlin and entrusted with the Academy of Sciences..."

Consequently, the coin and gem collection was placed in the Antique Chamber of the Berlin City Palace. In 1828 the sculptures and busts followed, which, after being restored in the workshop of the sculptor Christian Daniel Rauch, found their place in the Altes Museum in Lustgarten. The museum was built to the design of the architect Karl Friedrich Schinkel and opened in 1830.

In June 1828 Friedrich William III had the second version of a coffin designed by Christian Daniel Rauch set into the now-empty Antique Temple. The coffin's famous original lay in the mausoleum in the park of Charlottenburg Palace in Berlin, which was completed for Queen Louise, who died on 19 July 1810. Until 1904 the copy remained in the Antique Temple, and arrived in Spring 1877 in the Hohenzollern Museum, situated in Monbijou Palace, which was open to the public. The Monbijou Palace was destroyed during the Second World War.

== Planned change of use under Wilhelm II ==
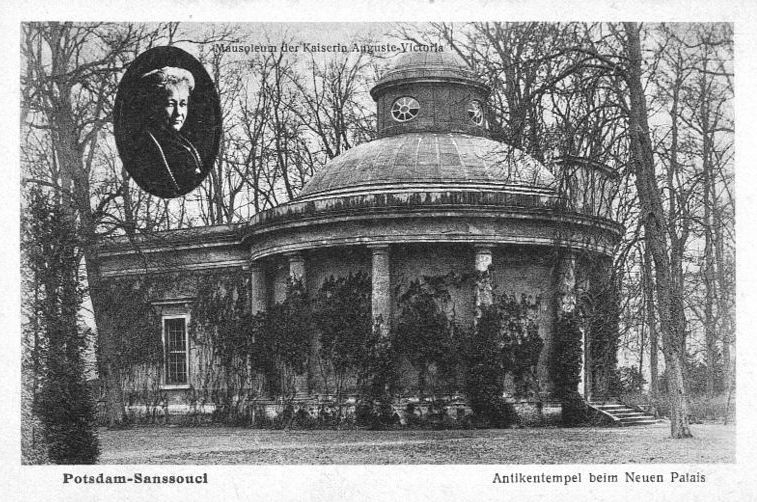
The Antique Temple after 1921 with the likeness of the late Empress Augusta Victoria

Plans for the use of the Antique Temple as a court chapel were made during the reign of Wilhelm II, the last German Emperor. The architect Ernst von Ihne drew up several designs. The first from 1904/05 suggested a conversion in the style of the Italian High Renaissance. Eight years later, in 1913, came plans for classical interior decoration. Due to other building projects and the outbreak of the First World War, the project was never realised, however. Even a suggestion from 1918, to furbish a gravesite for the imperial leadership, did not come to fruition. However, on 19 April 1921, Empress Augusta Victoria was laid in the Antique Temple, according to her wishes, and until the 1940s the Antique Temple became the final resting place of other members of the House of Hohenzollern.

== Usage as a mausoleum ==
Five members of the House of Hohenzollern are buried in the Antique Temple:

- Empress Augusta Viktoria (born 22 October 1858; died 11 April 1921)

The first wife of Emperor Wilhelm II died in exile in Doorn House, near Utrecht in the Netherlands, following a serious illness.

- Prince Joachim of Prussia (born 17 December 1890; died 18 July 1920)

The youngest son of Wilhem II died one day after a suicide attempt with an army revolver in St. Josef Hospital, Potsdam. The prince's coffin initially lay in the sacristy of the Potsdam Church of Peace and was transferred to the Antique Temple in 1931.

- Prince Wilhelm of Prussia (born 4 July 1906; died 26 May 1940)

Prince William was the eldest son of Crown Prince Wilhelm, German Crown Prince and his wife, Duchess Cecilie of Mecklenburg-Schwerin, as well as grandson of Wilhelm II. The prince took part in the invasion of France during World War II. He was wounded during the fighting in Valenciennes and died in a field hospital in Nivelles.

- Prince Eitel Friederich of Prussia (born 7 July 1883; died 8 December 1942)

The second eldest son of Wilhelm II died in Ingenheim, his villa in Potsdam.

- Hermine Reuss, German Empress and Queen of Prussia (a title held in pretence as her husband had ceased to be German Emperor and King of Prussia in November 1918), formerly Dowager Princess of Schönaich-Carolath, (born 17 December 1887; died 7 August 1947)

The second wife of William II died suddenly of a heart attack in a small flat in Frankfurt (Oder), where she was under heavy guard by the Soviet occupation force.

== Architecture ==
=== Outer features ===
The building is an unadorned closed round temple, surrounded by ten Tuscan columns, forming a Beehive tomb. The inner diameter of the building (the rotunda) is about sixteen meters in length. The square annex at the back of the building measures 9.4 metres × 9.4 metres, and is overlooked by three windows. The arched roof is crowned by a cupola, from which four diagonal-oval window openings admit light into the central chamber. The building can be entered through a single entrance: a rounded, four-metre-high (13 ft) door at the head of a staircase. An oblong gable over the cornice accentuates the building's front.

=== Interior decoration ===
The wall surfaces of the rotunda are decorated with grey Silesian marble. Large sculptures and vessels stand on a bench of wood which still runs around the building. Above them are antique busts, which stand on fifty brackets on three tiers. A marble relief of Emperor Trajan on his Horse, in gold framing, likewise still decorates the area of a wall over the entrance door today. A faded painting on the inside of the cupola shows genies in the clouds holding a garland of flowers. The surfaces of the annex, which can be reached from the rotunda through a rounded door, are paneled with wood.
