= Brandenburg Gate (Potsdam) =

Triumphal arch in Potsdam, Germany

Coordinates: 52°23′58″N 13°02′53″E

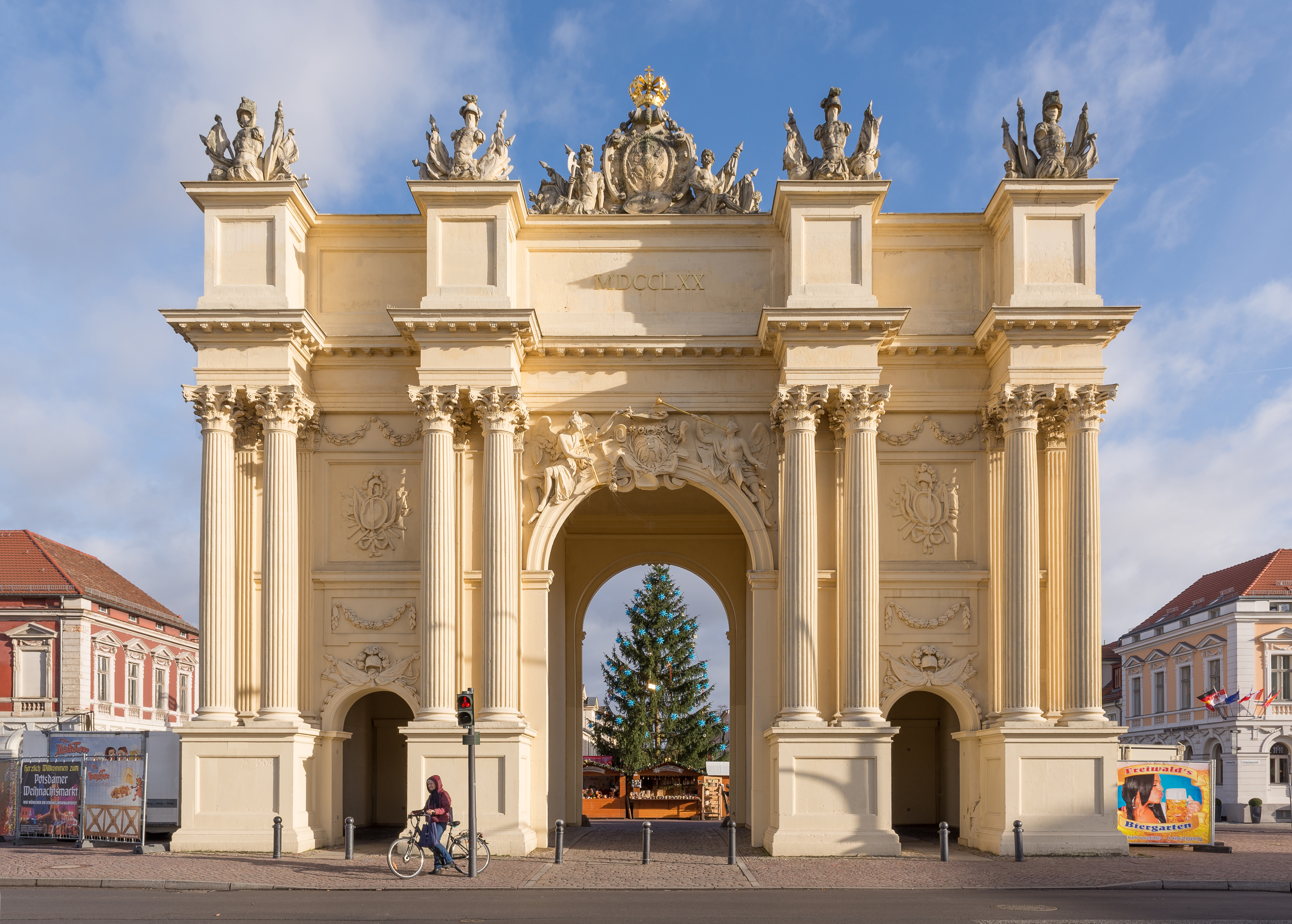
Brandenburg Gate, outer side by Georg Christian Unger

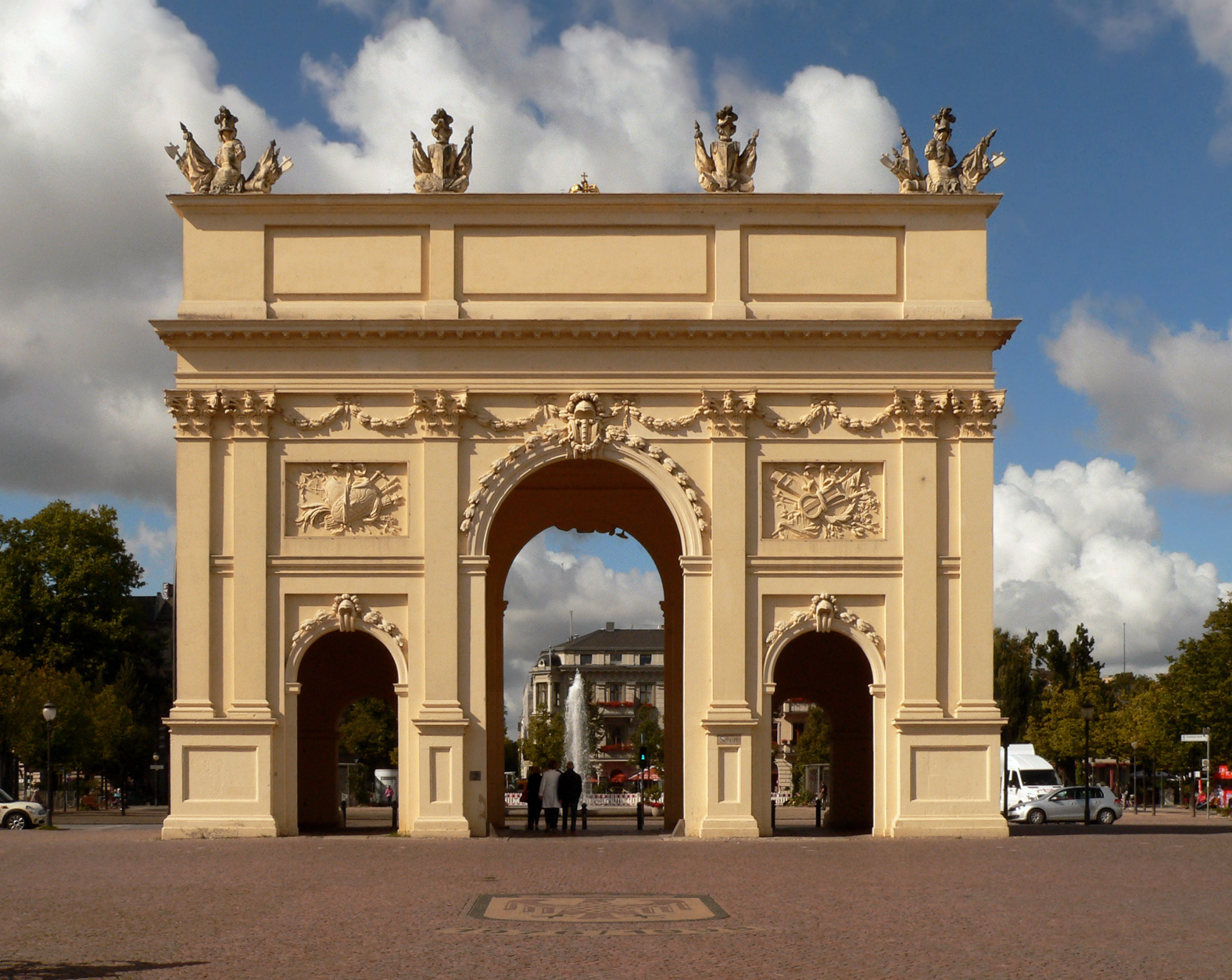
Brandenburg Gate, inner side by Carl von Gontard

The Potsdam Gate (German: Brandenburger Tor) on the Luisenplatz in Potsdam, was built in 1770–71 by Carl von Gontard and Georg Christian Unger by order of Frederick II of Prussia, to celebrate his several victories in the Seven Years' War.

An unusual feature of the Brandenburg Gate is that the two long sides are very different in style, and designed by two architects. Carl von Gontard designed the inner or city-facing side, and his pupil, Georg Christian Unger, the side facing out to what was then the countryside. Both use the Corinthian order. Gontard made the inner side as a rendered facade with only pilasters and trophies, while Unger designed the outer side more elaborately in the style of the Arch of Constantine with projecting Corinthian pairs of columns and more prominent decorative sculpture. The two side entrances for pedestrians were not added until 1843, under Frederick William IV, in order to cope with the increase in pedestrian traffic.

Since the city wall was demolished around 1900 the Brandenburg Gate has been a free-standing structure. It stands at the western end of Brandenburger Straße, which runs in a straight line up to the Peter and Paul Church, Potsdam.

== History ==
Previously, from 1733, there was another, simpler gate on the same spot, which resembled a castle gateway. Together with the city wall, a form of toll or excise barrier, and the other gates it was intended to prevent desertion and smuggling.

Towards the end of the Seven Years' War, Frederick the Great had the old gate demolished and built, in its stead, this new Brandenburg Gate, as a symbol of his victory. For that reason the Brandenburg Gate resembles a Roman triumphal arch. Its prototype was the Arch of Constantine in Rome. The Roman influence of its architectural style can be seen, for example, in the double columns of Corinthian order as well as the design of the attic.

At that time people had to pass the Brandenburg Gate if they wanted to make their way to the town of Brandenburg, hence the name. The gate leads walkers into the city centre pedestrian zone of Brandenburger Straße in an easterly direction up to priory church of St. Peter and St. Paul.

== Sources ==
- Paul Sigel, Silke Dähmlow, Frank Seehausen und Lucas Elmenhorst, Architekturführer Potsdam, Dietrich Reimer Verlag, Berlin 2006, ISBN 3-496-01325-7.
