= Huis Doorn =

National museum and house in Doorn, Netherlands

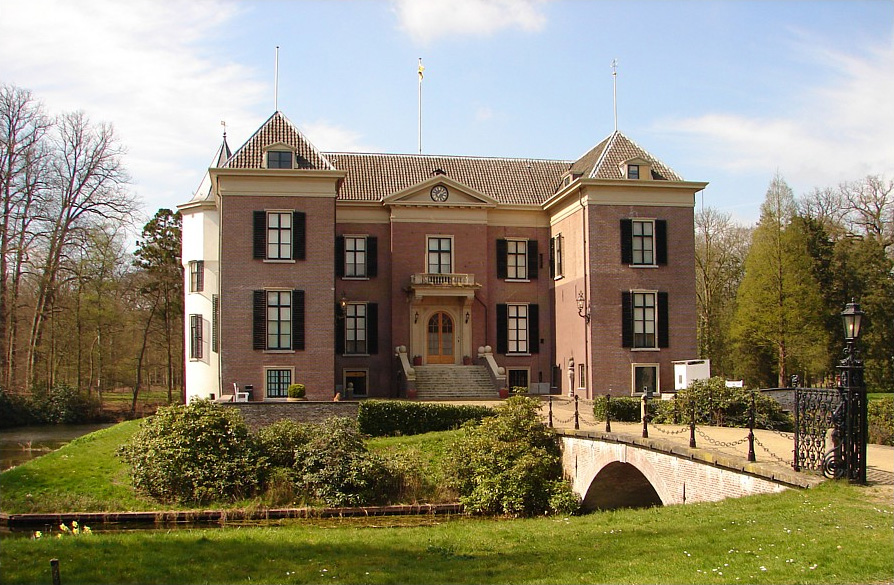
- Huis Doorn in 2010

- Location of the museum in Utrecht in the Netherlands
- Established: 1956
- Location: Langbroekerweg 10; Doorn, Netherlands
- Coordinates: 52.0314°N 5.3386°E
- Type: National museum Historic house museum
- Visitors: 25,000 (2012)
- Director: F.M. Louhenapessy
- President: R.C. Robbertsen
- Website: www.huisdoorn.nl

Huis Doorn (Dutch pronunciation: [ɦœyz ˈdoːr(ə)n]; (Note: In isolation, Huis is pronounced [ɦœys].) English: House Doorn) is a manor house and national museum in the town of Doorn in the Netherlands. The residence has early 20th-century interiors from the time when former German Emperor Wilhelm II resided there (1920–1941).

Huis Doorn was built in the 13th century. It was rebuilt in the 14th century, after it was destroyed. It was again rebuilt in the 19th century to its present-day form. The gardens were designed in the 19th century. After World War I, Wilhelm II bought the house, where he lived in exile from 1920 until his death in 1941. He is buried in a coffin within a mausoleum in the gardens. After the German occupation in World War II, the house was seized by the Dutch government as enemy property.

Huis Doorn is now a national museum and a national heritage site. The interior of the house has not been changed since Wilhelm II died. Every year in June, German monarchists come to Doorn to pay their respects to the emperor. In 2019, the museum had 54,000 visitors.

== Early history ==
The original structure was built in the 13th century, but was destroyed and rebuilt in the 14th century. It was again rebuilt in the late 18th century in a conservative manner and yet again, in the mid-19th century. A park which surrounds the building was laid out as what the Dutch describe as an English landscape garden at the start of the 19th century, but later adjusted by Wilhelm and others to add features including areas of woodland garden.

Baroness Ella van Heemstra (1900–1984), the mother of actress Audrey Hepburn, spent much of her childhood living in the house.

== Residence of Wilhelm II ==
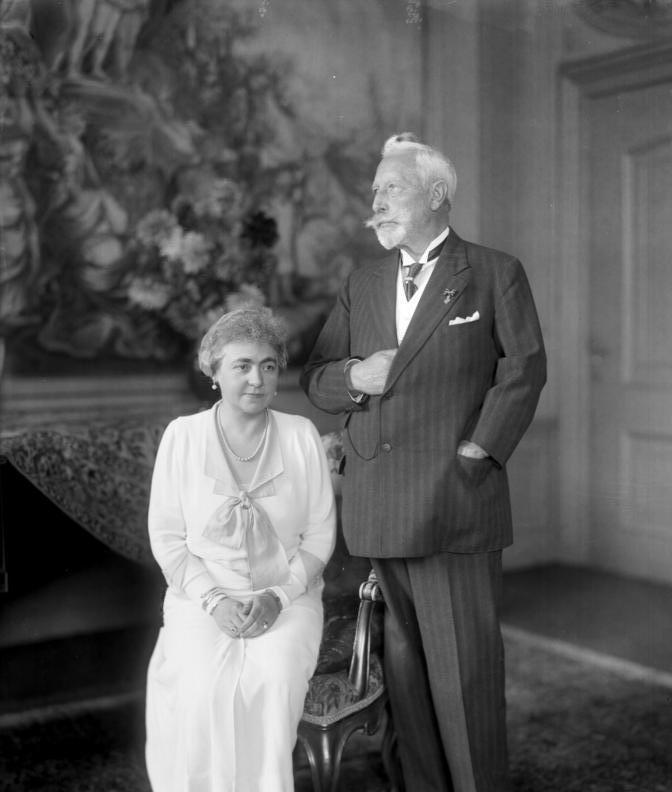
Hermine Reuss of Greiz and Wilhelm II at Huis Doorn in 1933

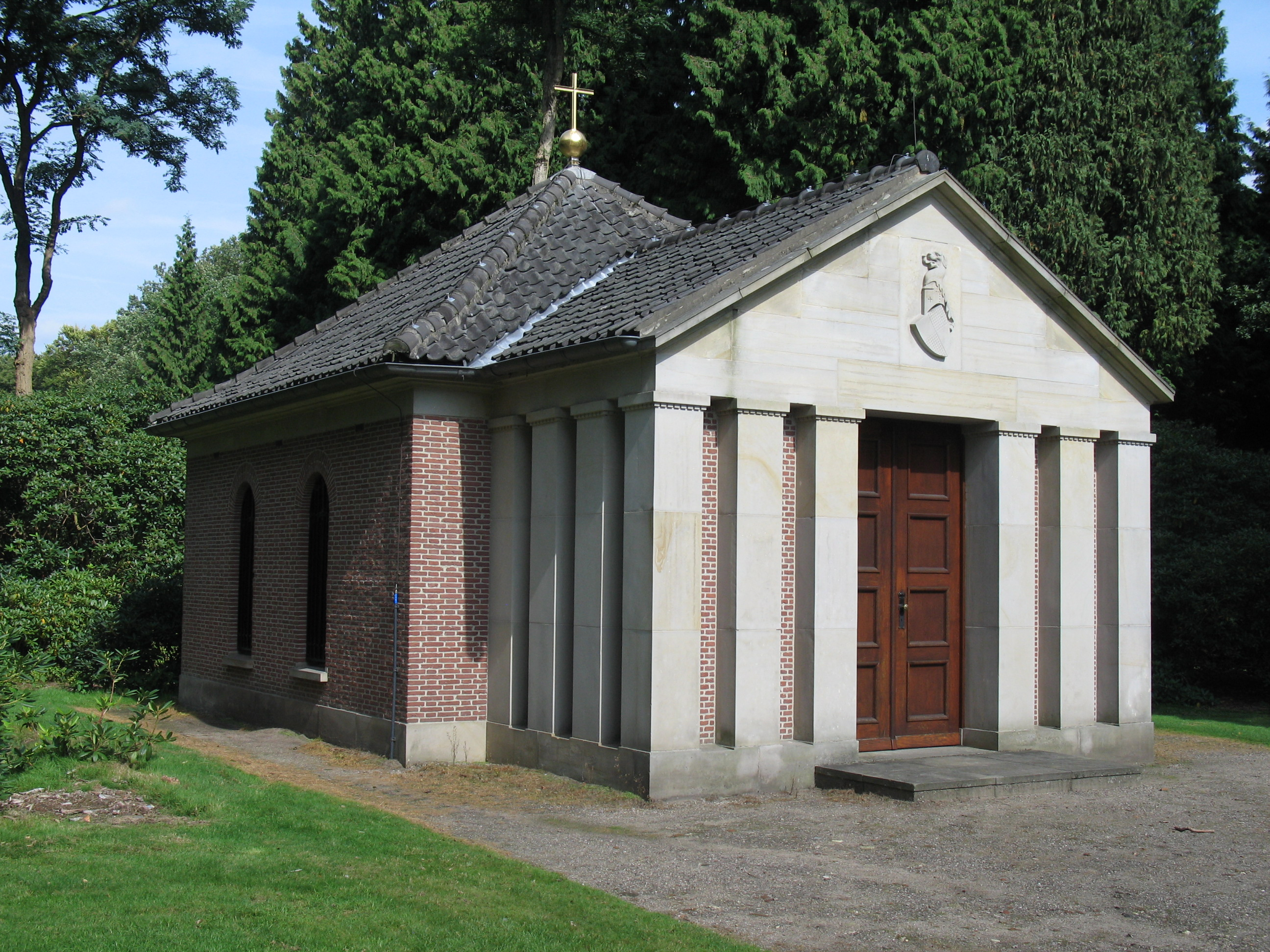
Mausoleum of Wilhelm II

The property was purchased for 500,000 guilders in 1919 by Wilhelm II, the last German Emperor (German: Kaiser), as his residence-in-exile (1920–1941), following his abdication after World War I. Wilhelm's asylum in the Netherlands was based on family ties with Queen Wilhelmina. However, Wilhelmina always refused to meet Wilhelm. During his years in exile, he was allowed to travel freely within a 10-kilometre radius of his house, but journeys further away meant that advance notice had to be given to a local government official. As he disliked having to answer to a minor official, he rarely travelled beyond the "free" limit. The former Emperor regularly exercised by chopping down many of the estate's trees, splitting the logs into stacks of firewood, thereby denuding the matured landscape as the years progressed. Hence he was called by his enemies "The Woodchopper of Doorn".

His first wife, Augusta nicknamed Dona, died at Huis Doorn on 11 April 1921 and her body was taken back to Potsdam in Germany, where she was buried in the Antique Temple. The funeral ceremony took place in Doorn.

In January 1922, Wilhelm invited the widowed princess Hermine of Greiz and her young son to Huis Doorn. He took a liking to Hermine's company. They had much in common and got married on 5 November 1922. Hermine lived in Huis Doorn with Wilhelm in his exile until his death in 1941. She then returned to Germany and after her death, she was also interred in the Antique Temple in Potsdam due to being Wilhelm's second wife. Hermine undertook the property management of Huis Doorn, and in 1927, she wrote her autobiographical book An Empress in Exile: My Days in Doorn.

In 1931 and 1932, there were meetings with Hermann Göring. The audiences did not go well, and Wilhelm developed a severe disliking for Göring. Wilhelm was known for anti-Semitic views, but he did have close Jewish friends like Walther Rathenau, and was outraged by the Kristallnacht.

In 1938, Wilhelm's grandson, Prince Louis Ferdinand, was married to Grand Duchess Kira of Russia, in Huis Doorn. Thirty members of royal families attended the ceremony. However, Queen Wilhelmina sent her daughter Princess Juliana.

On 10 May 1940, Germany invaded the Netherlands. Wilhelm had been offered asylum in Great Britain, but he refused to take up the offer. On 14 May, the Wehrmacht arrived at Huis Doorn, but Wilhelm and his household was undisturbed. German officers were forbidden to enter his estate, and Wilhelm remained under guard there during the occupation.

Wilhelm II died of a pulmonary embolism at Huis Doorn, on 4 June 1941, with German occupation soldiers on guard at the gates of his estate. He lies in a maroon-coloured coffin, above the ground, in a small mausoleum in the gardens, to await his return to Germany upon the restoration of the Prussian monarchy, according to the terms of his will. His wish that no swastikas be displayed at his funeral was not heeded.

Five of Wilhelm's beloved dachshunds are buried in the park. A marker is dedicated to the memory of his dog, Senta, who was a favourite of Wilhelm’s and died in 1927 at the age of 20.

== Historic house museum ==
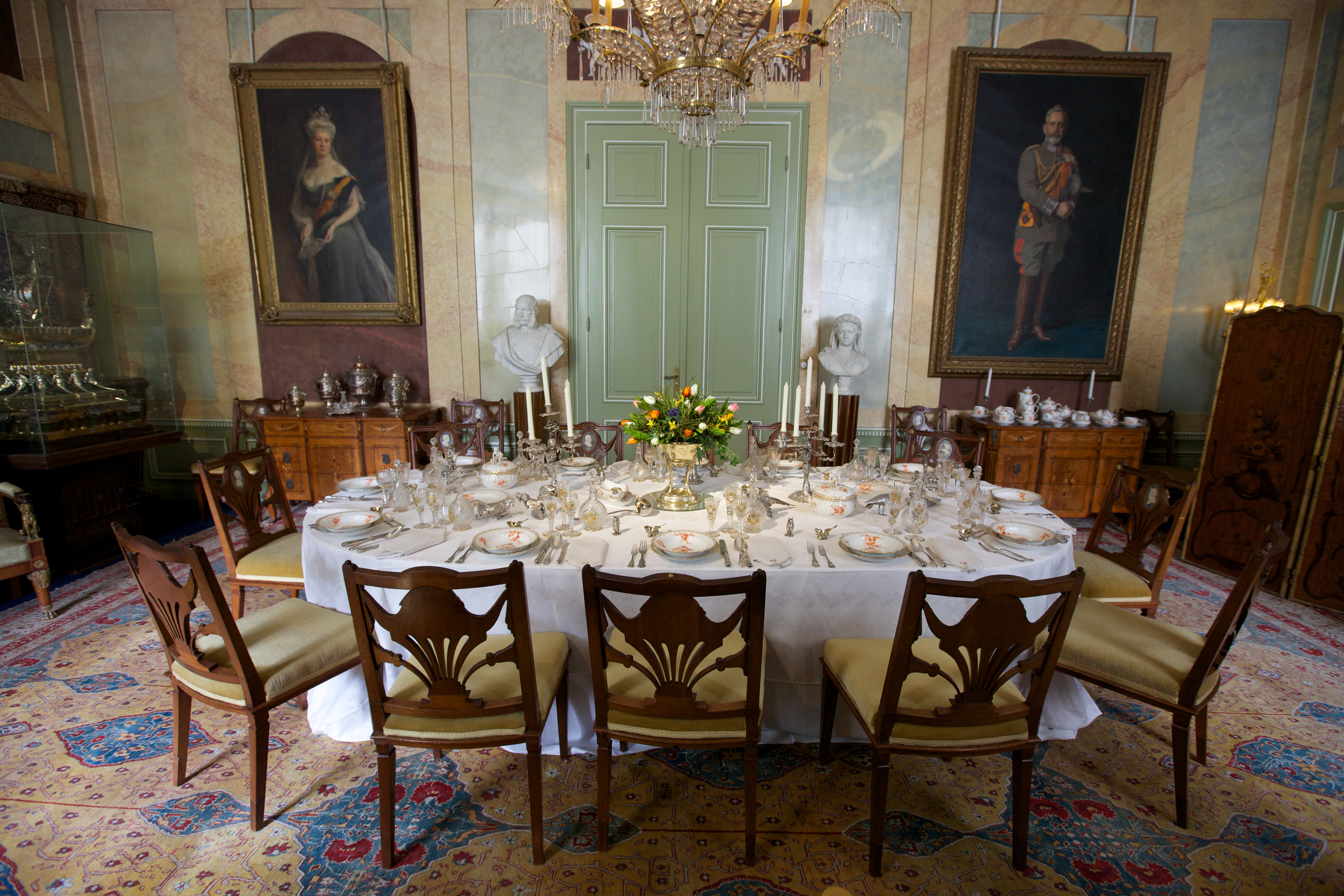
The dining room in 2013

The Dutch government seized the manor house and its household contents in May 1945 and, since then, many new trees have been planted and the wooded parkland is being returned to its earlier state.

Huis Doorn opened its doors as a historic house museum in 1956. It is presented just as Wilhelm left it, with marquetry commodes, tapestries, paintings by German court painters, porcelains and silver. It also includes Wilhelm's collections of snuffboxes and uniforms that belonged to Frederick the Great.

In June each year, a devoted band of German monarchists come to pay their respects and lay wreaths, accompanied by marchers in uniforms and representatives from modern monarchist organisations, like the now-defunct Tradition und Leben of Cologne.

The house became a national heritage site or rijksmonument in 1997. In 2014, Georg Friedrich, Prince of Prussia, filed a claim on the estate which was rejected by Minister Jet Bussemaker.
