= Temple of Friendship =

Coordinates: 52°24′02″N 13°01′08″E

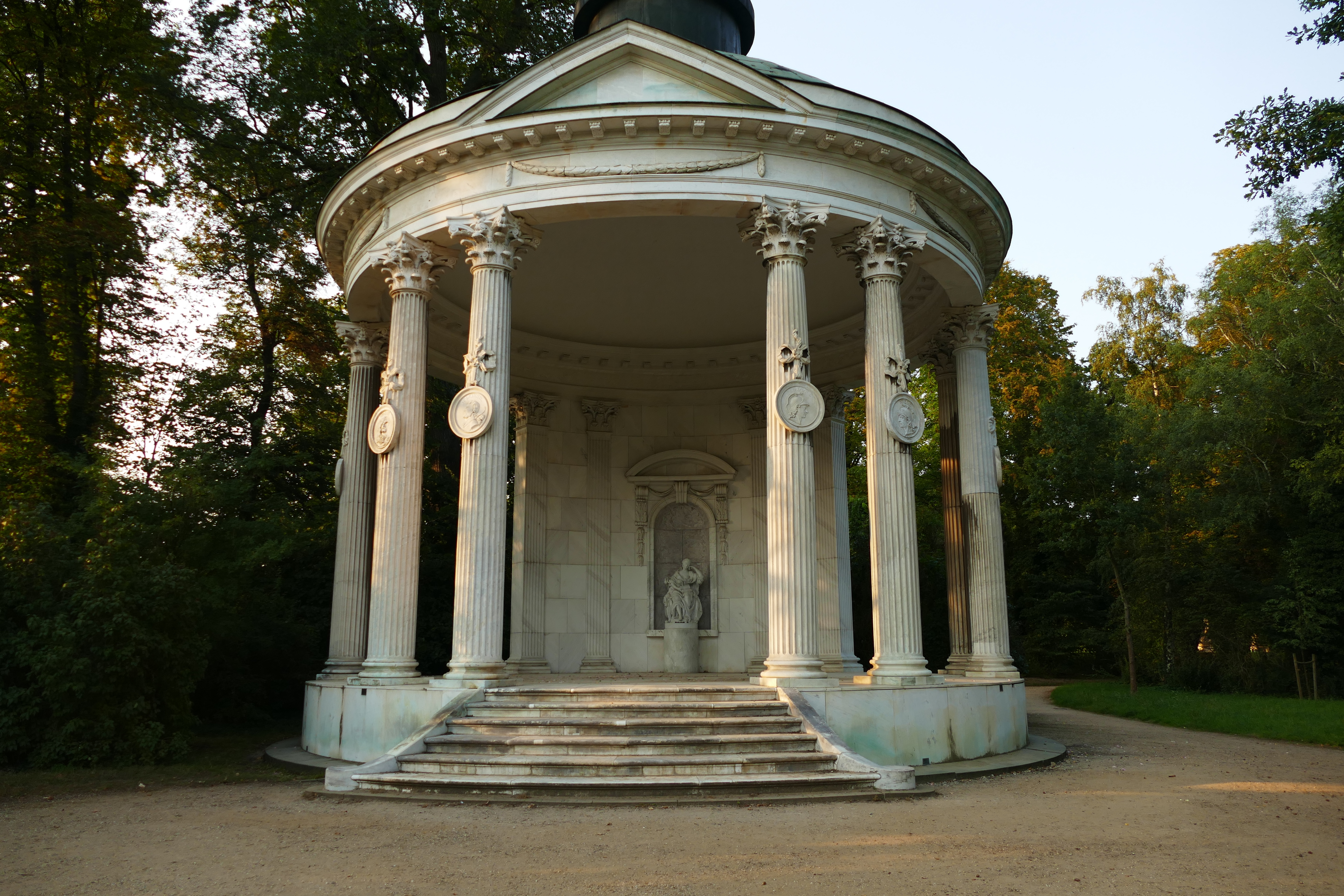
The Temple of Friendship

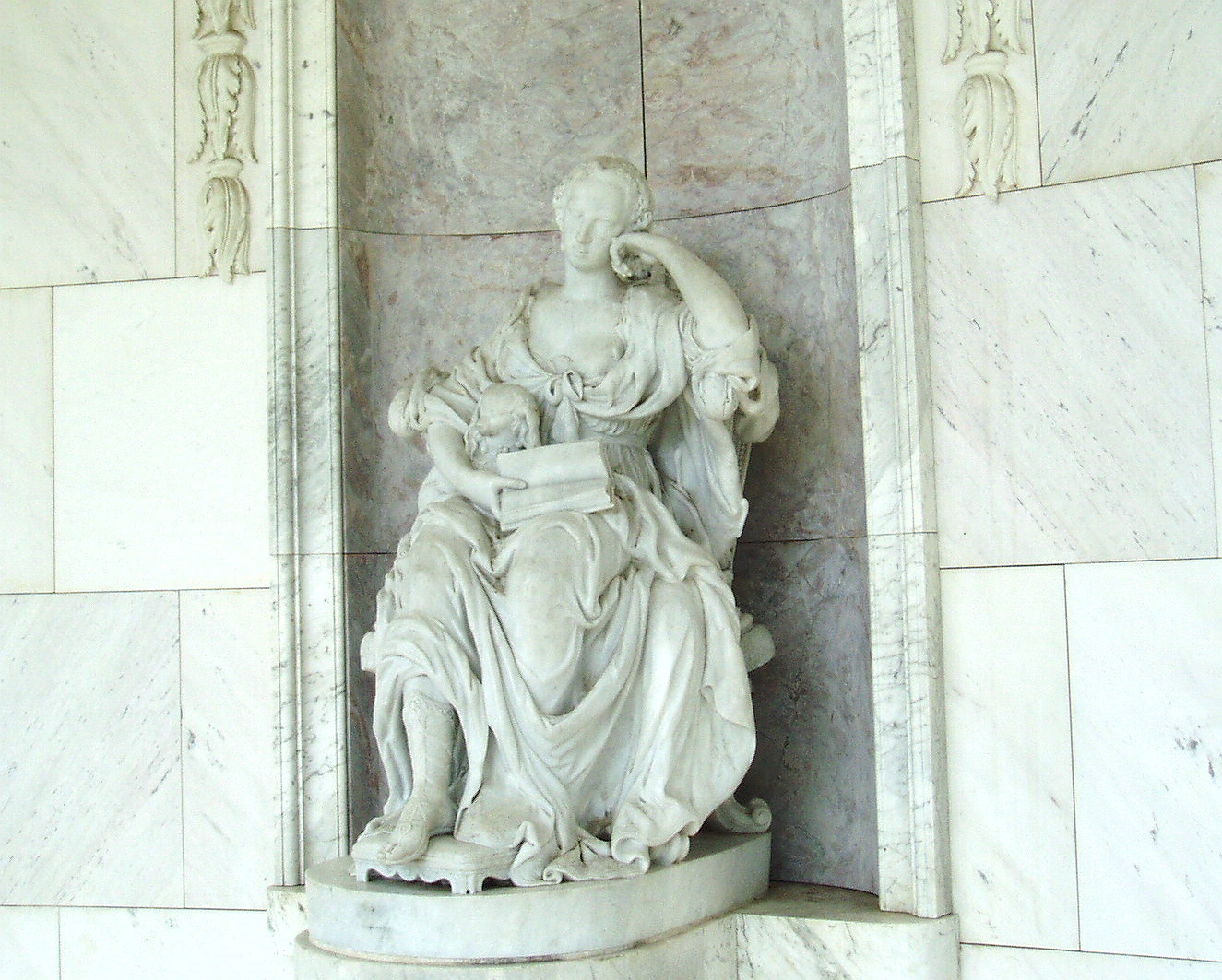
Statue of Wilhelmine of Bayreuth in the Temple of Friendship

The Temple of Friendship (German: Freundschaftstempel) is a small, round building in Sanssouci Park, Potsdam, in Germany. It was built by King Frederick II of Prussia in memory of his sister, Princess Wilhelmine of Prussia, who died in 1758. The building, in the form of a classical temple, was built south of the park's main boulevard between 1768 and 1770 by architect Carl von Gontard. It complements the Temple of Antiquities, which lies due north of the boulevard on an axis with the Temple of Friendship.

== The First Pavilion in Neuruppin ==
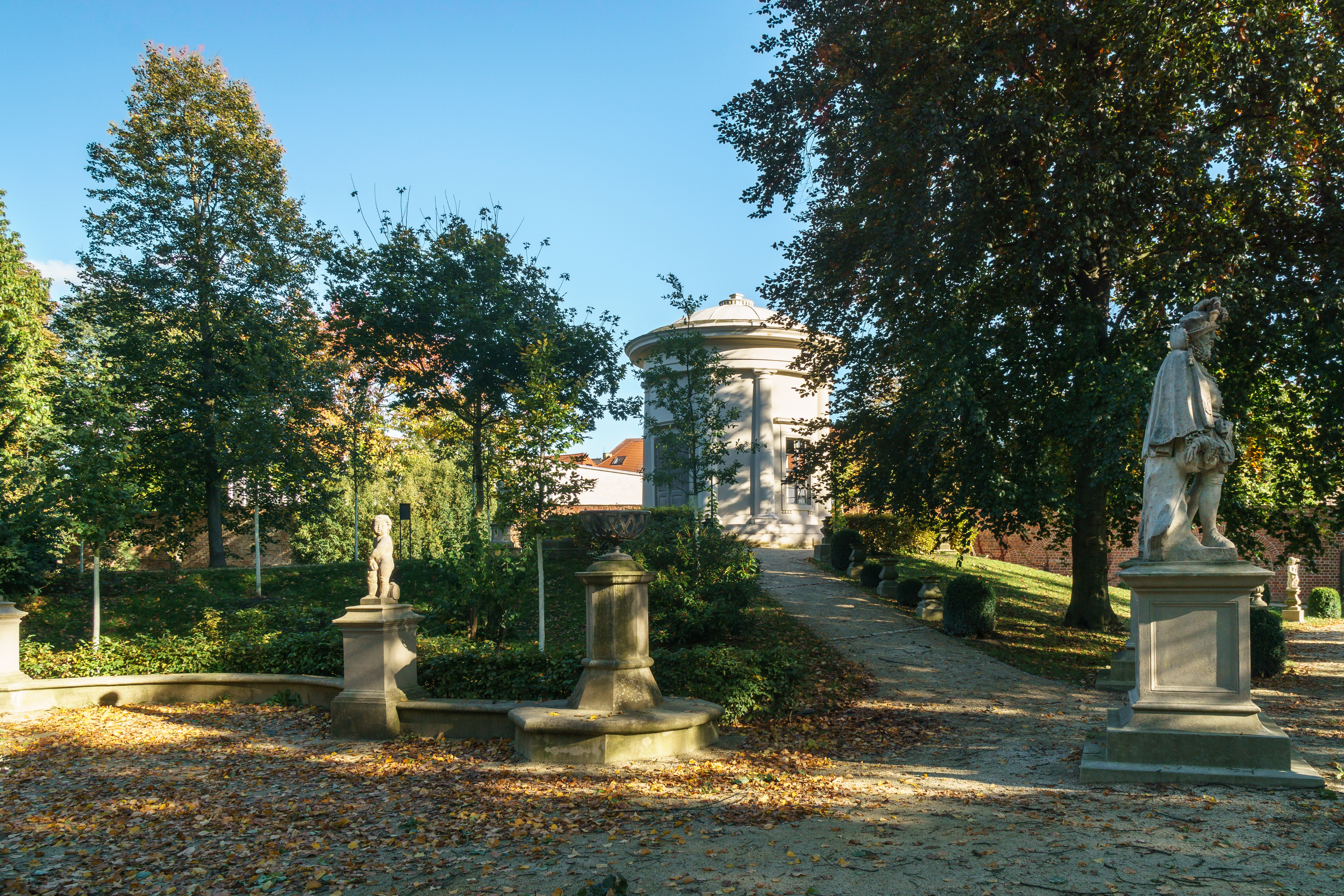
The Temple of Apollo in Neuruppin

A notable precursor of the Temple of Friendship was the smaller Temple of Apollo constructed in 1735 at Neuruppin, where Crown Prince Frederick (later Frederick II) resided from 1732 to 1735 as the commander of a regiment stationed there. The first building designed by Georg Wenzeslaus von Knobelsdorff, the Temple of Apollo was situated in the Amalthea Garden, a flower and vegetable garden created by Frederick.

The Temple of Apollo was an open, round temple, although in 1791 it was enclosed by brick walls between its columns. In August 1735, Frederick wrote to his sister Wilhelmine, who at that time was already married and living in Bayreuth: "The garden house is a temple of eight Doric columns holding up a domed roof. On it stands a statue of Apollo. As soon as it is finished, we shall offer sacrifices in it – naturally to you, dear sister, protectress of the fine arts."

== The Pavilion in Sanssouci Park ==
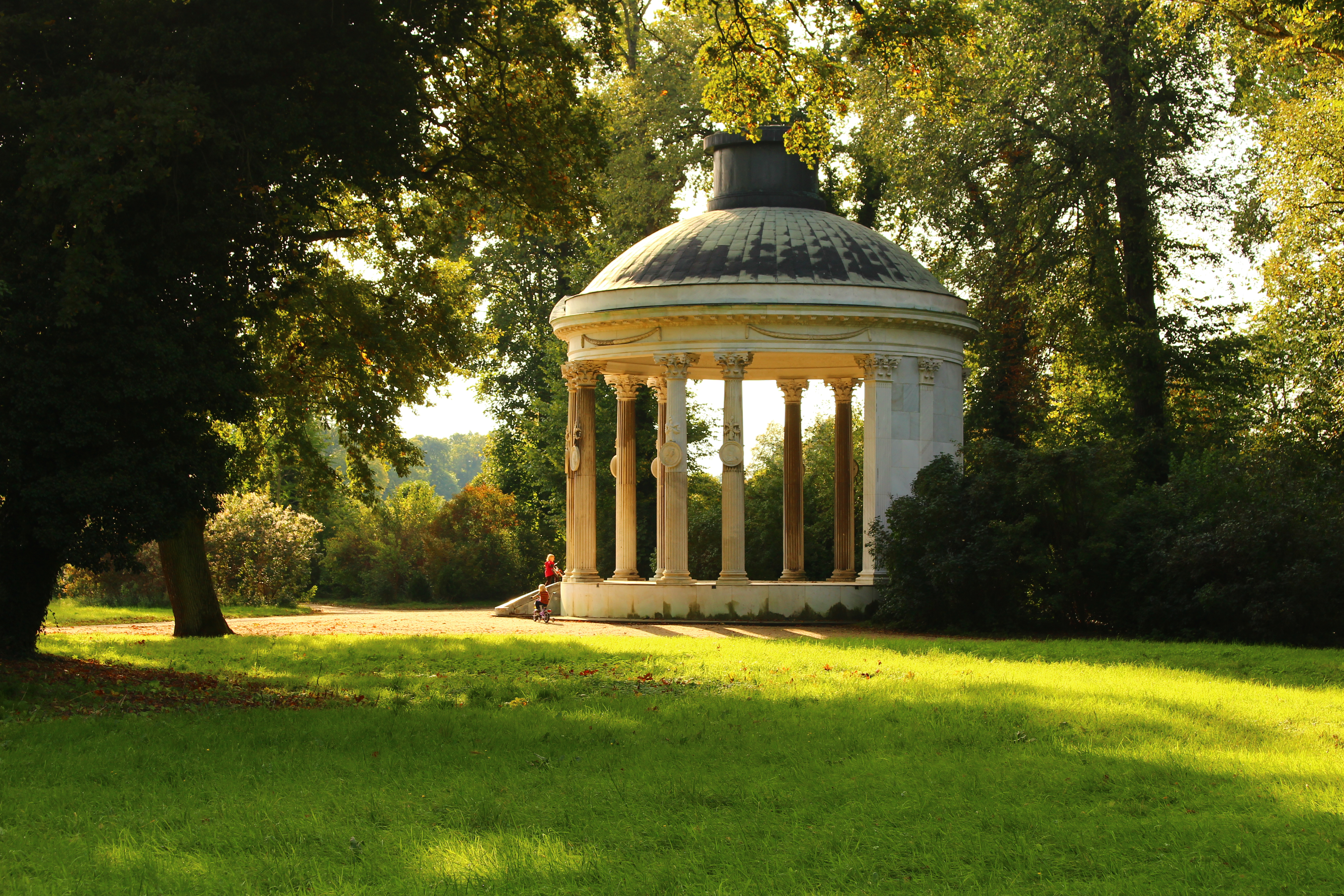
The pavilion in Sanssouci Park

To honor the memory of Wilhelmine, Frederick chose, as he had in Neuruppin, the form of an open, round temple with a shallow domed roof supported by eight Corinthian columns. This architectural structure, the monopteros type, has its origins in ancient Greece, where such buildings were erected over cult statues and tombstones.

In a shallow alcove at the back wall of the temple is a life-sized statue of Wilhelmine of Bayreuth, holding a book in her hand. The marble figure is from the workshop of the sculptor brothers Johann David and Johann Lorenz Wilhem Räntz and is based on a portrait by the court painter Antoine Pesne. The medallions on the columns depicting pairs of friends in classical antiquity as well as the book in Wilhelmine's hand point to her fascination with that era. Moreover, the homoerotic dimension of the classical couples may have made them especially appealing to the temple's builder, Frederick II, whose homosexual orientation was already the subject of much speculation and rumor during his lifetime.

Pairs of Friends

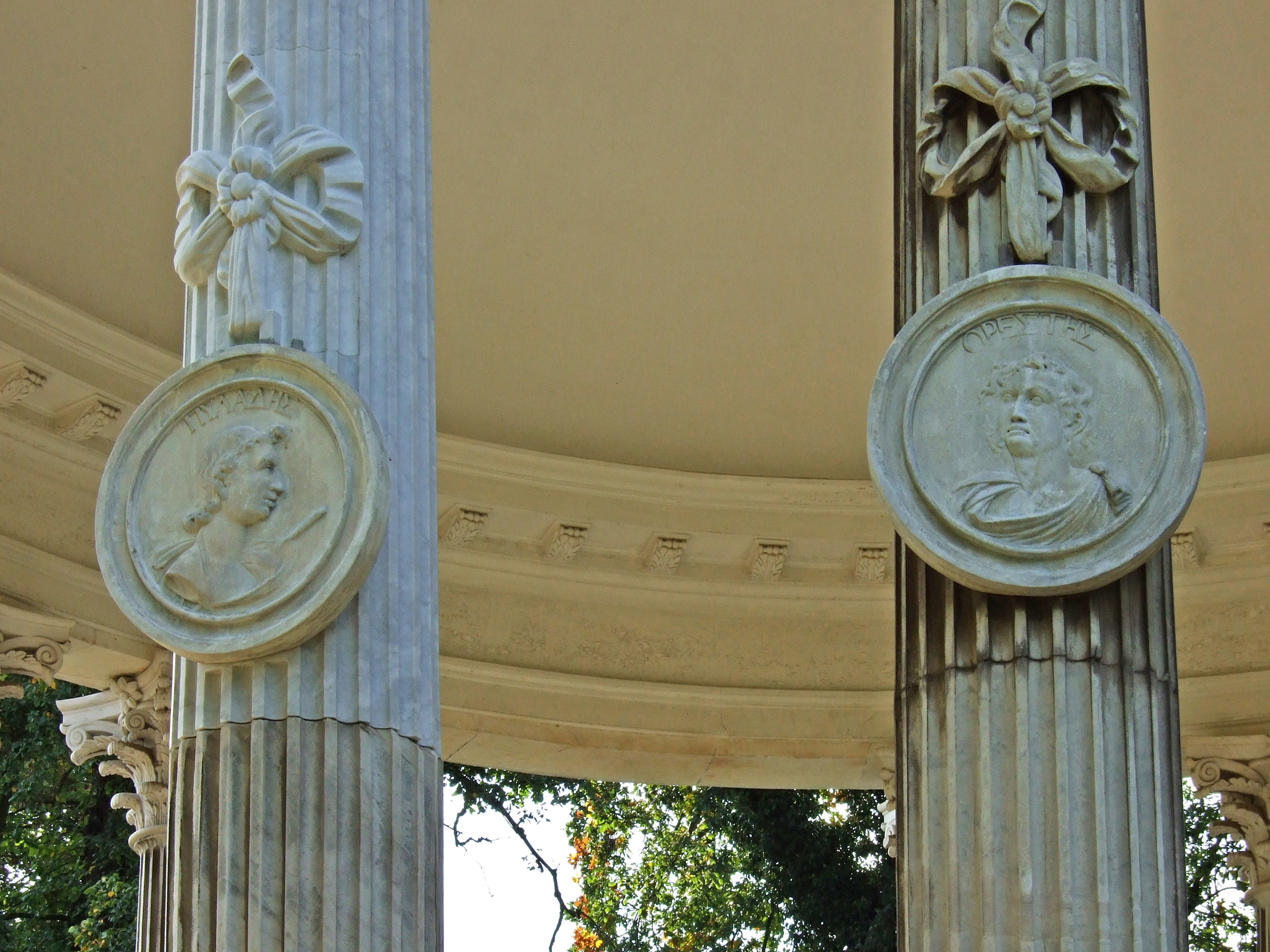
Pylades & Orestes

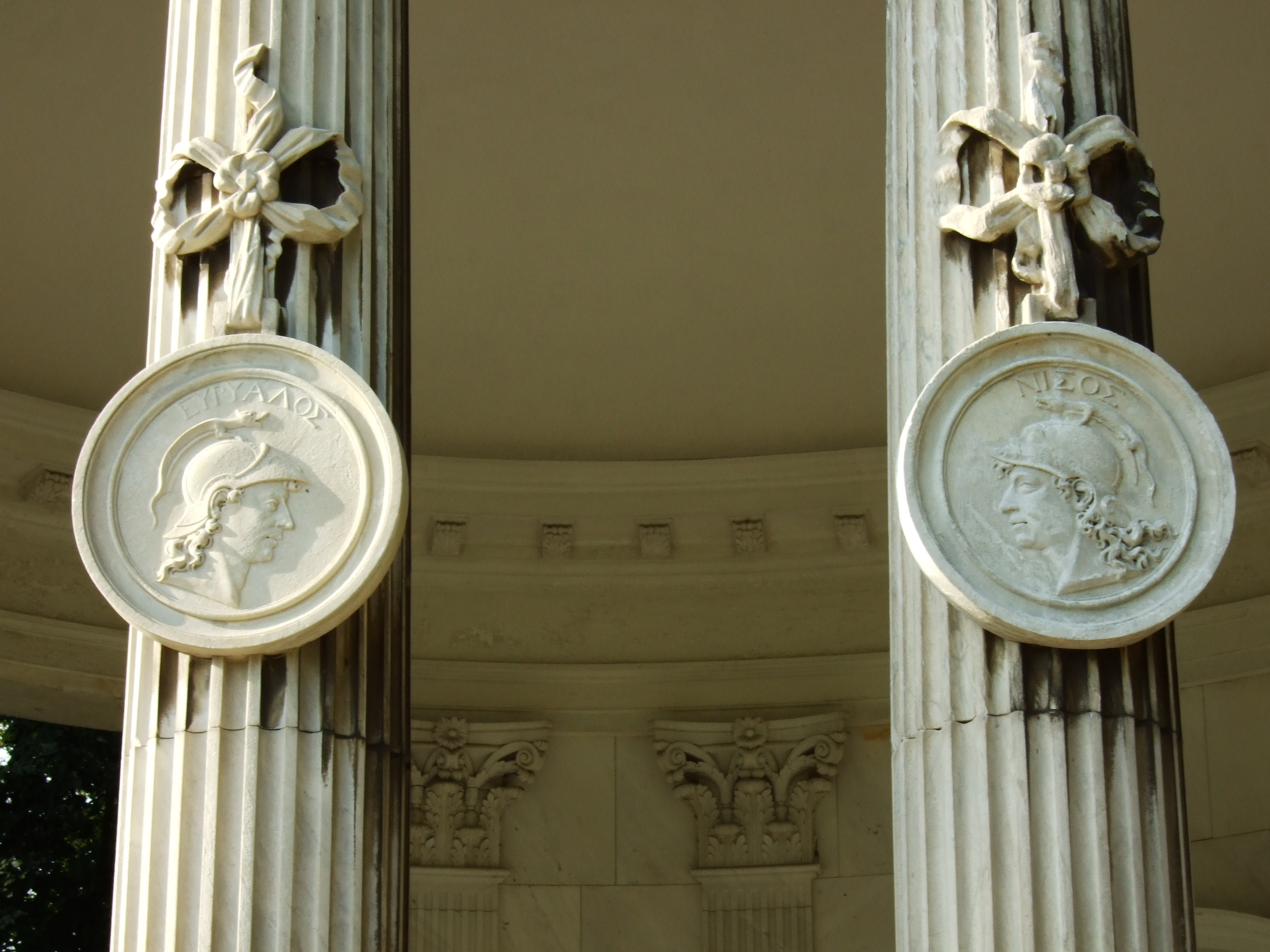
Euryalus & Nisos

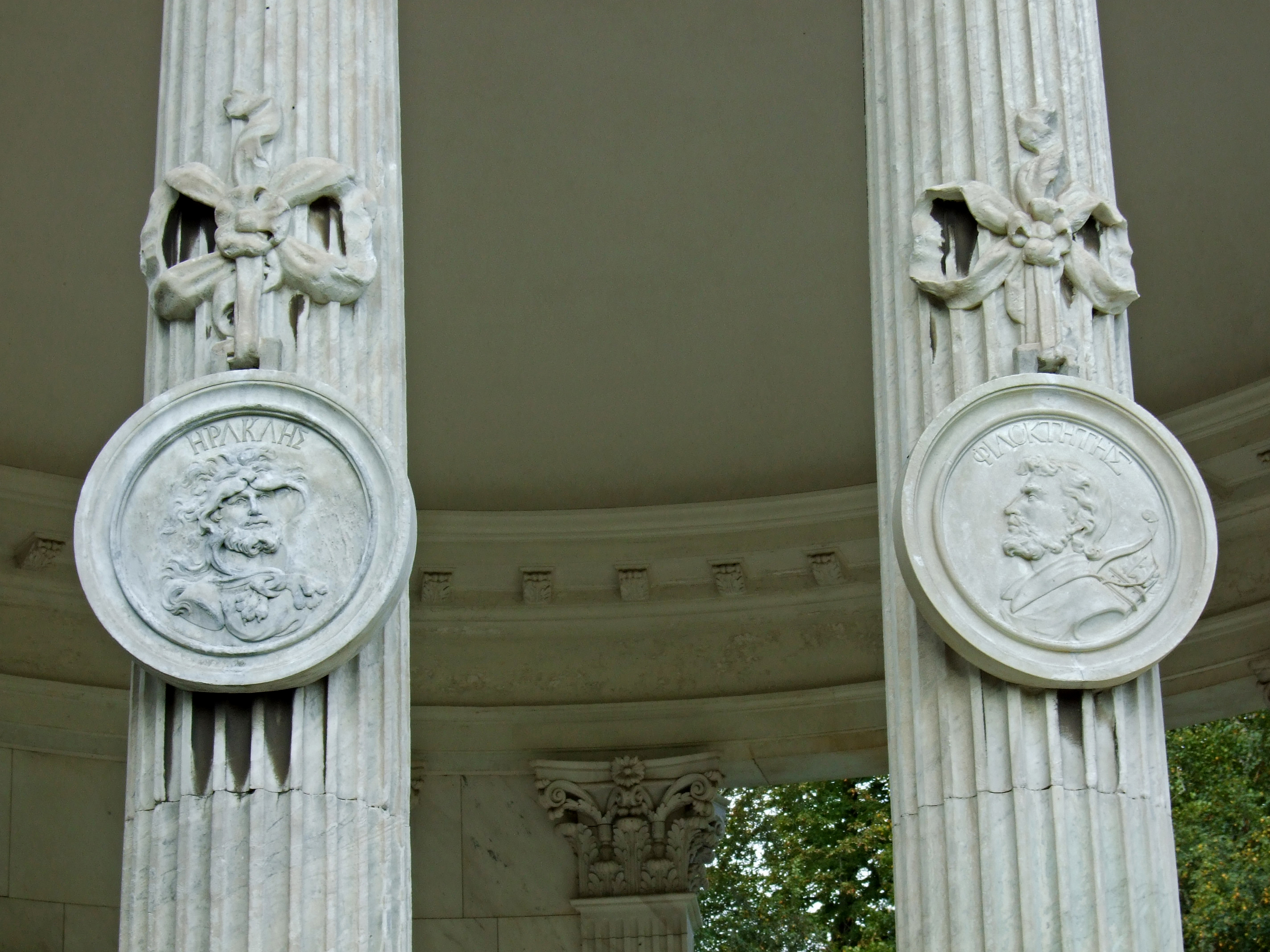
Heracles & Philoctetes

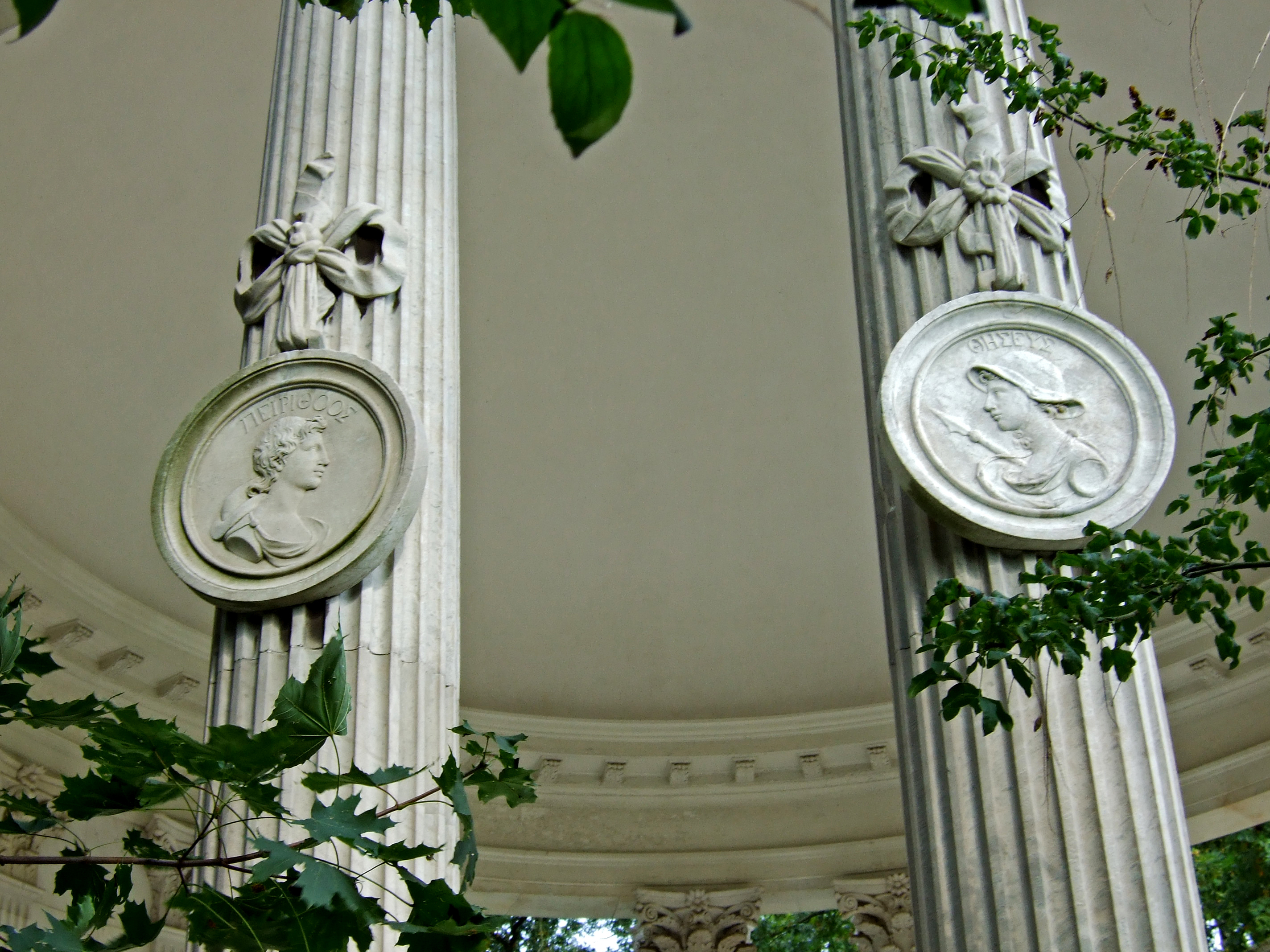
Pirithous & Theseus
