= House of Schoenaich-Carolath =

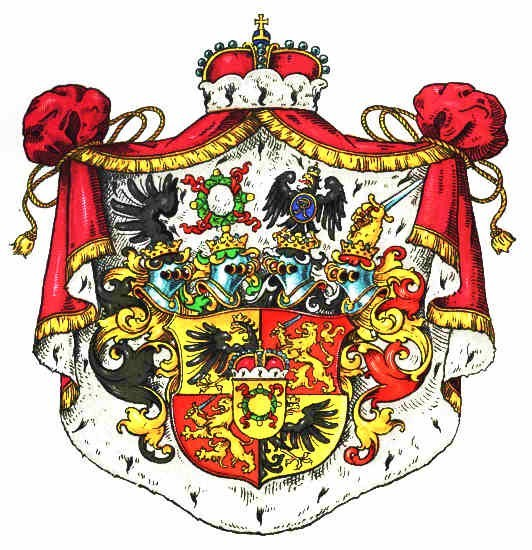
Coat of arms of the Princes of Carolath-Beuthen and the Princes of Schoenaich-Carolath

The House of Schönaich-Carolath or Schoenaich-Carolath is an ancient German noble family from Lower Lusatia, a branch of which came to Silesia in the 16th century. The Silesian branch was elevated to the rank of Imperial Count in 1700 and to the rank of Prince in the Kingdom of Prussia, in 1741.

== History ==
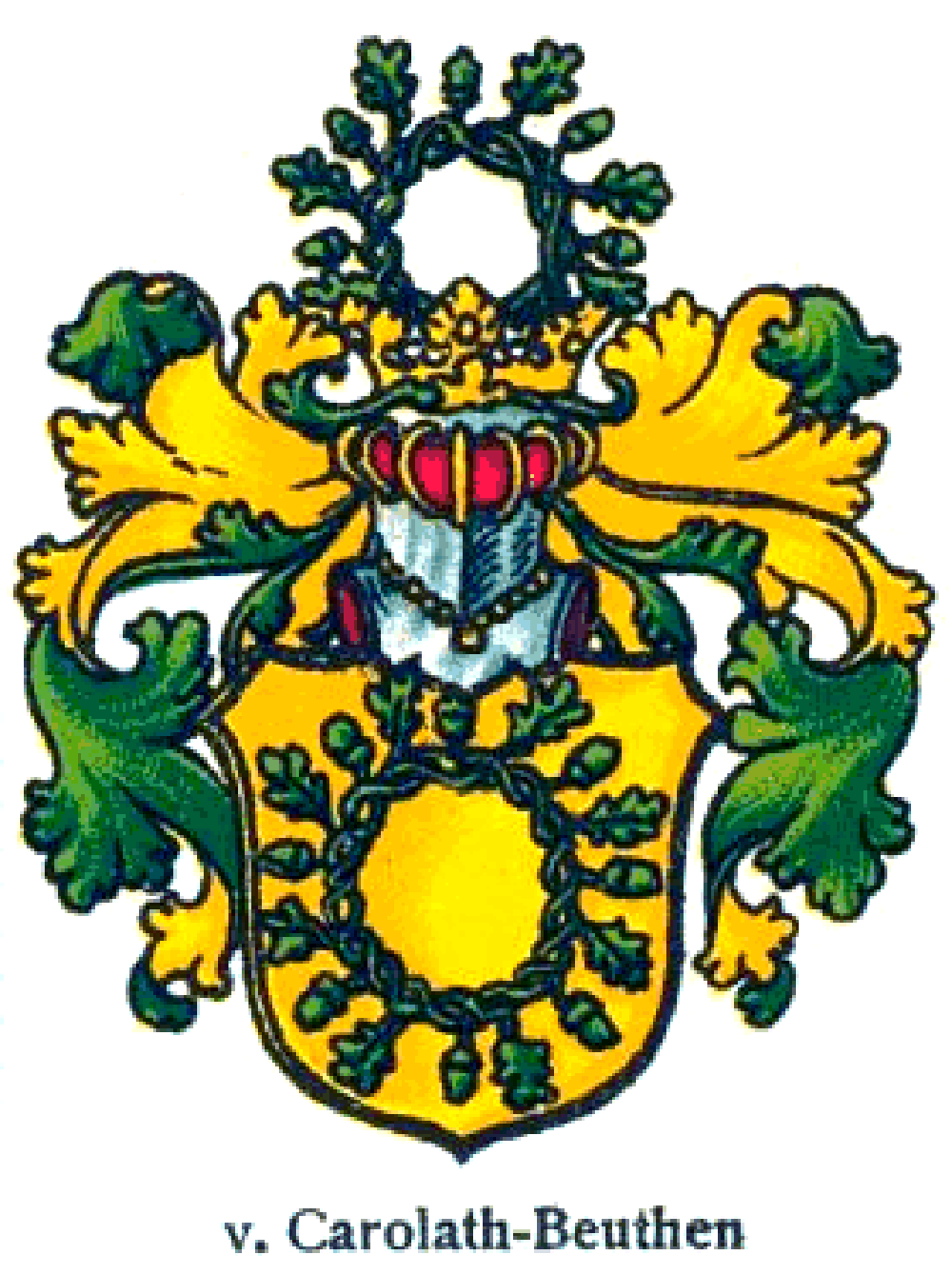
Original Coat of arms of the Schöneich family

The Schoenaich family descends from the ancient nobility of Lower Lusatia and is first documented in 1329 with Tytzko (Dietrich) von Schoenaich. A village of the same name, known since 1945 as Piękne Kąty, is now part of Carolath. Another village of the same name is located near Sorau in the Neumark region, today's Sieciejów.

Around 1550, Fabian von Schoenaich (1509–1591) from the Sprottau line of Franz von Rechenberg acquired the Lower Silesian Lordships of Carolath and Beuthen an der Oder, which belonged to the Duchy of Glogau, a fiefdom since 1344 and reversionary to the Bohemian Crown in 1490. The sovereign confirmation of the entail took place in 1601 with the title "Baron of Beuthen" (Freiherr von Beuthen). On 28 June 1616, the hereditary Austrian baronial status was confirmed. Fabian appointed the son of a cousin, Georg von Schönaich, as his heir. In 1595, he married Fabian's widow, Elisabeth von Landskron (d. 1614), and in 1597, he had Carolath Castle built. In 1613, he acquired the Amtitz estate in Lower Lusatia, and in 1614, he founded the university-like educational institution known as the Schönaichianum in Beuthen an der Oder, where both Lutherans and Calvinists taught. His nephew, Johannes (1589–1639), paid homage to the Bohemian King Frederick V ("Winter King") during the Bohemian Revolt in 1618. As a result, he was fined in 1637, his lands confiscated, and the Schönaichianum handed over to the Jesuits during the Counter-Reformation. In 1697, the Bohemian ruler, Emperor Joseph I, granted the two estates legal status as Free Estates.

Baron Hans Georg von Schoenaich-Beuthen was elevated to the rank of Imperial Count in 1700. His son, Hans Carl zu Carolath-Beuthen (1688–1763), swore an oath of homage to the sovereign, Emperor Joseph I, in Breslau in 1710 and purchased the position of Privy Councilor in 1730. He also acquired the estates of Padligar and Ostreritz. After the conquest of Silesia by Frederick II in 1742, the Reformed Count was one of the first important Silesian magnates to pay homage to the Prussian king. In gratitude, he was elevated to the Prussian princely rank in 1741, receiving the title "Prince of Carolath-Schönaich" (Fürst zu Carolath-Schönaich), and from 1753 "Prince of Carolath-Beuthen" (Fürst zu Carolath-Beuthen), as well as the unlimited title of "Prince/ess of Schoenaich-Carolath" for his descendants—a unique honor from Frederick the Great. Hans Carl zu Carolath also rose to become the first President of the Higher Administrative Government (Oberamtsregierung) and President of the Constituent Assembly in Breslau. His son, Johann Carl Friedrich (1716–1791), served the king as a General and Envoy.

The brothers Karl (1785–1820) and Friedrich (1790–1859) founded the two lines of the house: the elder inherited the three Lordships of Carolath, Beuthen and Amtitz, the younger Saabor Castle and the Lordship of Saabor. A further division of the inheritance took place when the 5th Prince, Karl (1845–1912), received Carolath and Beuthen, and his younger brother Prince Heinrich (1852–1920) received the Lordship of Amtitz. The primogeniture title "Prince of Carolath-Beuthen" was confirmed to Prince Heinrich of Carolath-Beuthen in 1861 when the Prussian title of Serene Highness was awarded. The later-born members bear the name Prince or Princess of Schoenaich-Carolath. In 1854, the family achieved hereditary membership in the Prussian House of Lords.

In 1896, the estate and manor of Haseldorf (with Haselau and Hetlingen) in Schleswig-Holstein, as well as Palsgaard Castle (Schloss Palsgård) in Denmark, passed to Prince Emil von Schoenaich-Carolath-Schilden (1852–1908), son of Emilie von Oppen-Schilden. Haseldorf remains in the family to this day.

The widow of Prince Johann Georg (1873–1920) of Saabor, Princess Hermine Reuss of Greiz (1887–1947), became the second wife of the former German Emperor and Prussian King Wilhelm II in 1922.

With the flight and expulsion in 1945, the Silesian possessions were expropriated.

== Properties ==
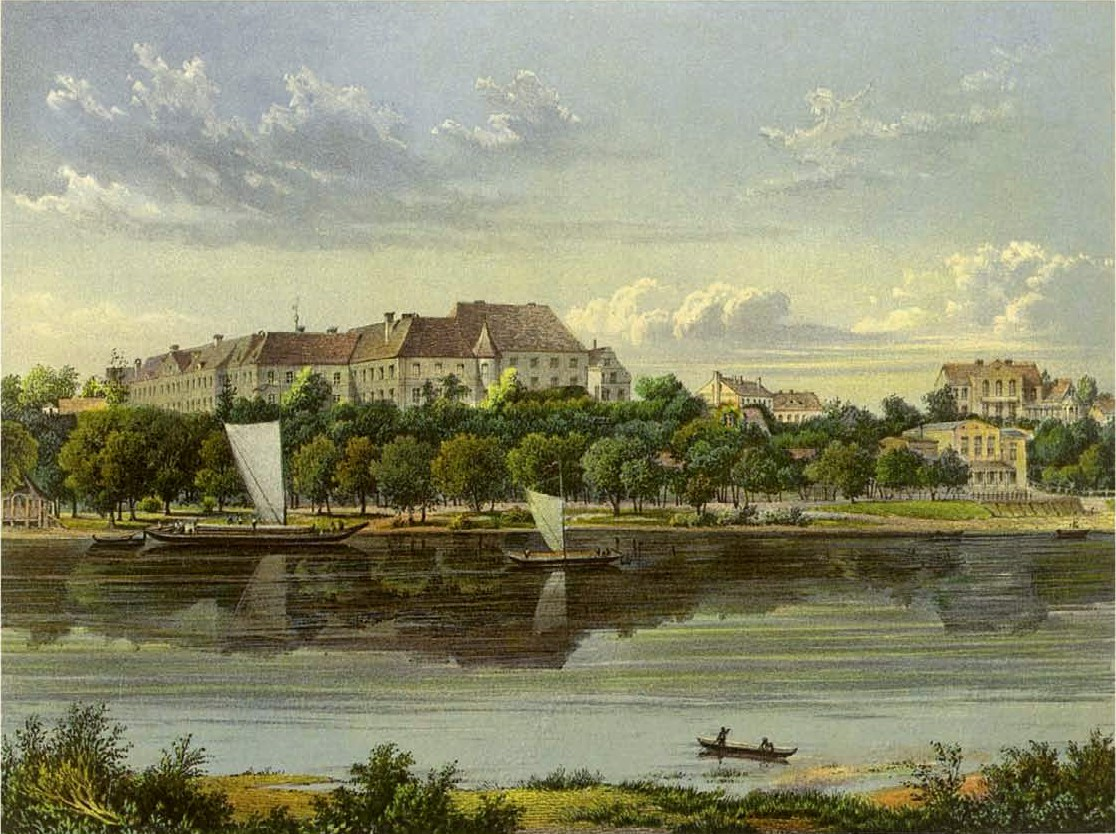
Carolath Castle, Lower Silesia (19th century)

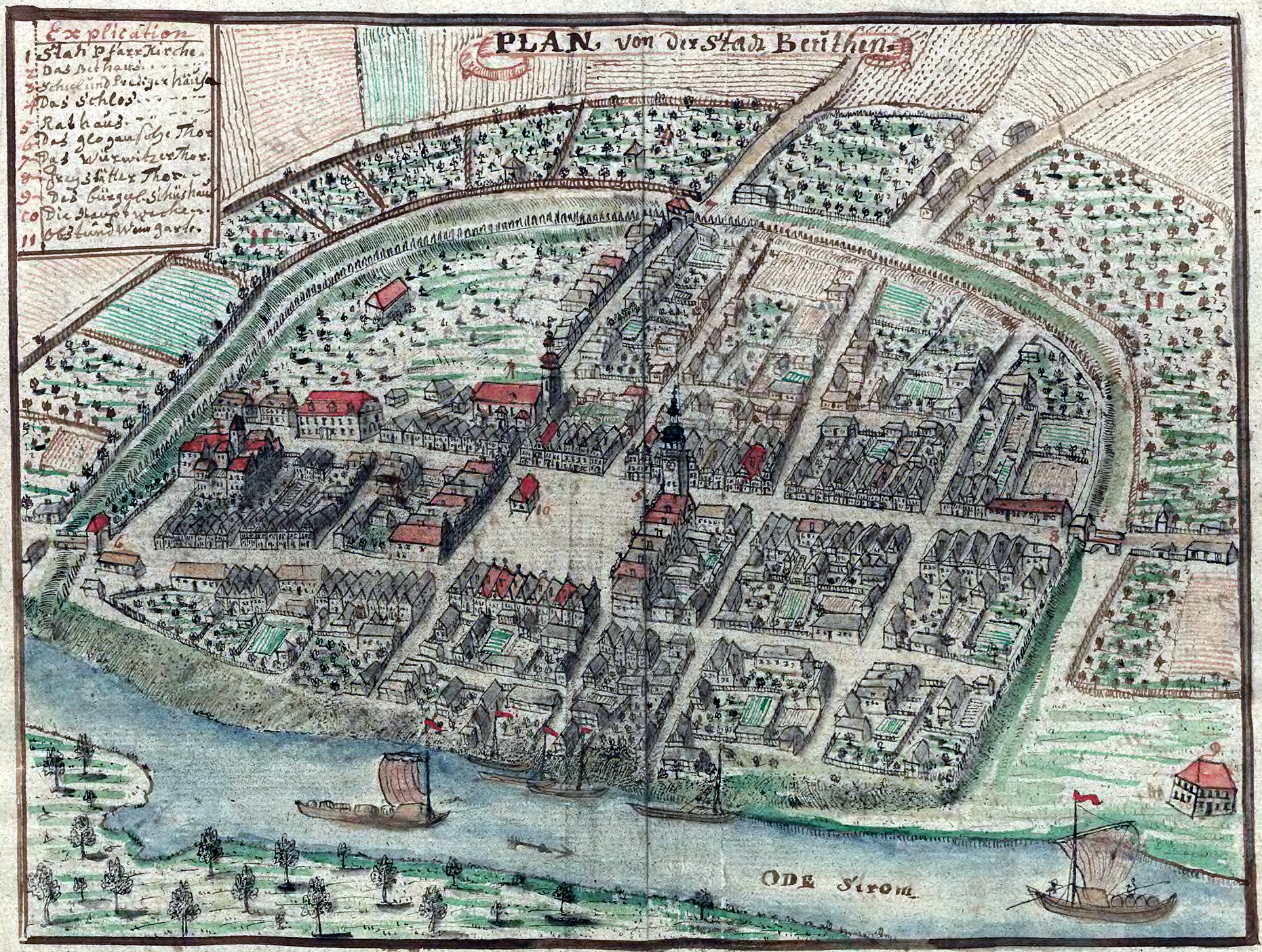
Beuthen an der Oder (18th century)

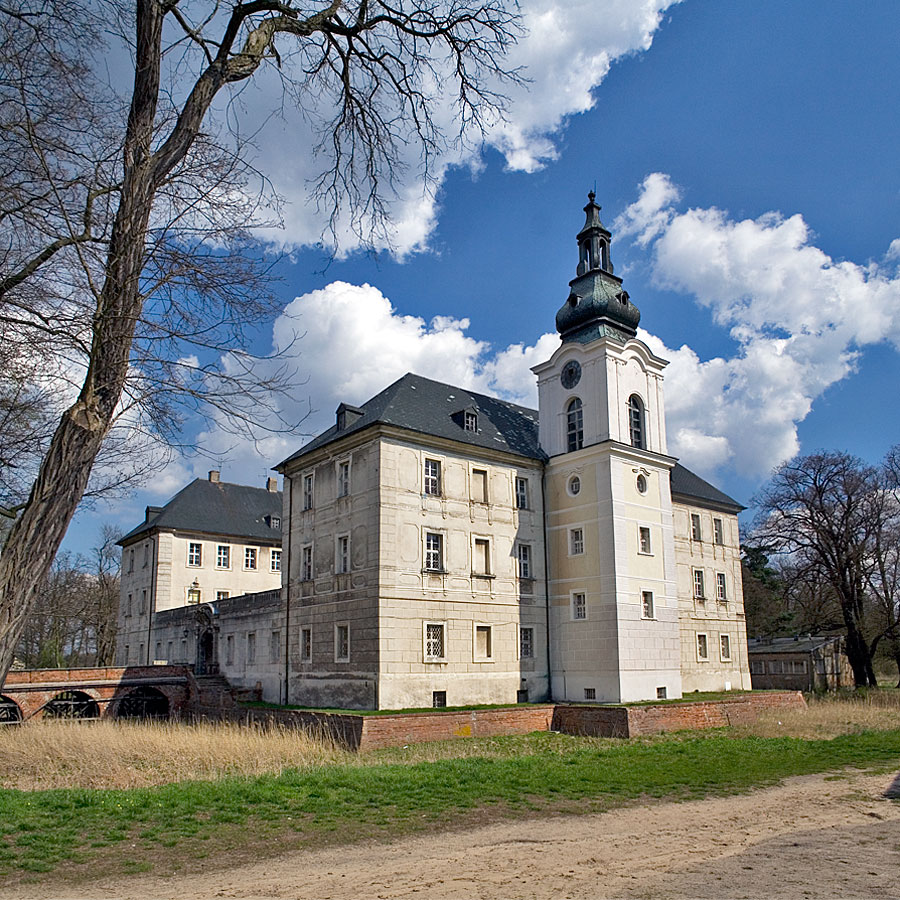
Zabór Castle in Zabór (Saabor)

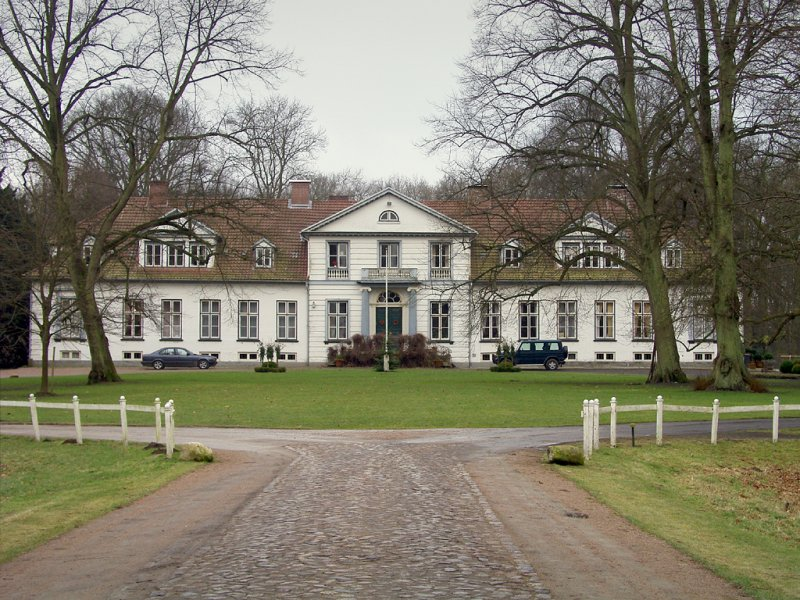
Haseldorf manor house, Holstein

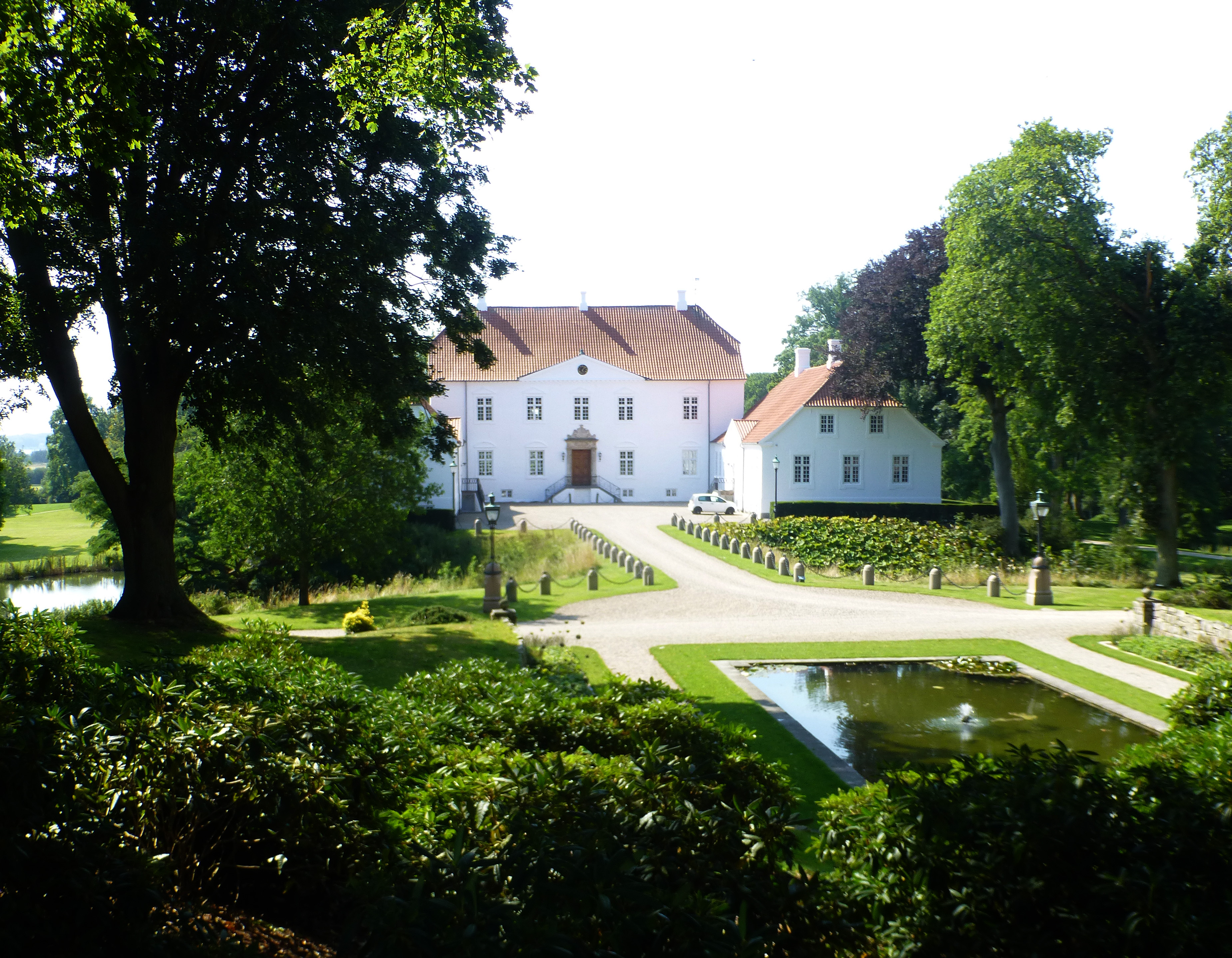
Palsgård Castle, Dänemark

== Members ==
=== Notable members ===
- Brandanus von Schöneich (d. 1507), German jurist, university professor and chancellor in Mecklenburg
- Kaspar von Schöneich (d. 1547), Chancellor in Mecklenburg
- Fabian von Schoenaich (1508–1591), Imperial Colonel, purchaser of Carolath and Beuthen
- Georg Philipp von Schönaich (1704–1790), Prussian major general, hereditary Lord of Schlaupitz and Mellendorf
- Georg von Schoenaich (1557–1619), German humanist, heir of Carolath and Beuthen
- Christoph Otto von Schönaich (1725–1807), writer, crowned poet laureate by Gottsched
- Andreas von Hoverbeck genannt von Schoenaich (1863–1918), Prussian colonel and military historian
- Paul von Hoverbeck genannt von Schoenaich (1866–1954), German general and pacifist

=== Princes of Schoenaich-Carolath (1741) / Princes of Carolath-Beuthen (1753) ===
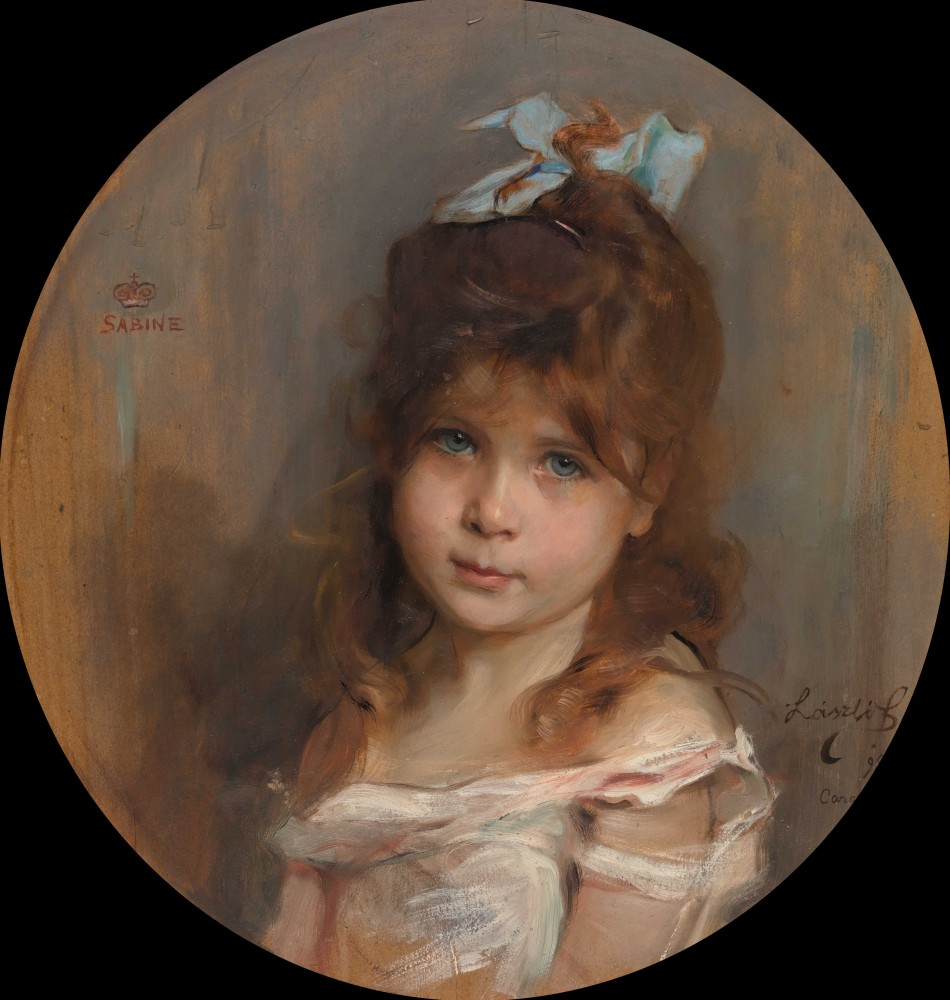
Princess Sabine zu Carolath-Beuthen, daughter of the 5th Prince of Carolath-Beuthen, and, later, wife of Prince Emich zu Salm-Horstmar, by Philip de László, 1898

- Hans Carl, 1st Prince of Carolath-Beuthen (1688–1763), m. Countess Amalia zu Dohna-Schlodien (1692–1761).
  - Johann Carl Friedrich, 2nd Prince of Carolath-Beuthen (1716–1791), m. Princess Johanna Wilhelmine of Anhalt-Köthen
    - Heinrich Karl Erdmann, 3rd Prince of Carolath-Beuthen (1759–1817), m. Princess Auguste Amalie of Saxe-Meiningen
      - Heinrich Karl Wilhelm, 4th Prince of Carolath-Beuthen (1783–1864), m. Countess Adelheid von Carolath-Beuthen of Pappenheim
      - Prince Karl Wilhelm Philipp Ferdinand (1785–1820); m. Countess Bianca von Pückler-Groditz
        - Prince Ludwig Ferdinand Karl Erdmann Alexander Deodatus (1811–1862), m. (1) 1840: Princess Adelheid von Schönaich-Carolath; m. (2) 1823: Countess Wanda Henckel von Donnersmarck.
          - Karl Ludwig Erdmann Ferdinand, 5th Prince of Carolath-Beuthen (1845–1912), m. (1) Countess Elisabeth von Hatzfeldt-Trachenberg; m. (2) Countess Katharina von Reichenbach-Goschütz.
            - Hans-Karl Erdmann Ludwig Hugo Heinrich Ferdinand, 6th Prince of Carolath-Beuthen (1892–1933), m. Irene von Anderten
              - Carl-Erdmann, 7th Prince of Carolath-Beuthen (1930–2016), m. (1): Caroline Staal; m. (2) Gerda Meyn; m. (3) Viola von Anderten
                - Volkmar, 8th Prince of Carolath-Beuthen (1958–2016), m. Petra Arlt
                  - Hans-Carl, 9th Prince of Carolath-Beuthen (b. 1960)
            - Princess Sabine Wanda Helene Luise Friederike Katharina (1893–1965) m. Prince Emich zu Salm-Horstmar (son of Otto, 2nd Prince of Salm-Horstmar)
          - Prince Heinrich Ludwig Erdmann (1852–1920), m. Princess Margarete zu Schönburg-Waldenburg
      - Prince Friedrich Wilhelm Karl (1790–1859), m. Princess Karoline Reuss of Köstritz
        - Prince Ferdinand Heinrich Erdmann (1818–1893), m. Princess Johanna Reuss of Köstritz
          - Prince Georg Heinrich Friedrich August (1846–1910), m. Princess Wanda von Schoenaich-Carolath
            - Prince Johann Georg Ludwig Ferdinand August (1873–1920), m. Princess Hermine Reuss of Greiz (after Prince Johann Georg's death, she married Wilhelm II)
              - Prince Hans Georg (1907–1943), m. Baroness Sibylle von Zedlitz und Leipe
              - Prince Ferdinand (1913–1973)
              - Princess Henriette (1918–1972), m. Prince Karl Franz of Prussia
          - Prince Johann Heinrich Friedrich August (1849–1910), m. Princess Helena von Leutenberg
        - Prince Karl Heinrich Friedrich Georg Alexander (1820–1874), m. Emilie von Oppen-Schilden
          - Prince Emil Rudolf Osman (1852–1908), m. Katharina von Knorring
        - Prince August Heinrich Bernhard (1822–1899), m. Princess Emma of Salm-Horstmar (daughter of Friedrich, 1st Prince of Salm-Horstmar)
