= Grotów =

Grotów may refer to the following places:

- Grotów, Strzelce-Drezdenko County in Lubusz Voivodeship (west Poland)
- Grotów, Żary County in Lubusz Voivodeship (west Poland)
- Grotów, Masovian Voivodeship (east-central Poland)
