= Maciejowski =

Maciejowski, f. Maciejowska, pl. Maciejowscy

Origin
- Language: Polish
- Meaning: derived from the Polish given name "Maciej"
- Region of origin: Poland

Other names
- Variant forms: Maciejewski; Matějovský (Czech form), Slovak: Maťašovský, Hungarian: Mattyasovszky(Magyarized form)

Maciejowski (feminine: Maciejowska; plural: Maciejowscy) is a Polish surname derived from any of geographical locations derived from the given name Macjej (Maciejów, Maciejówka, etc.).

It may refer to:

- Bernard Maciejowski, 17th-century Bishop of Krakow and Primate of Poland.
- Ignacy Maciejowski (1835–1901) a Polish writer.
- Jan Maciejowski, a British electrical engineer.
- Marcin Maciejowski (born 1974, Babice), a Polish painter.
- Samuel Maciejowski, 16th-century Bishop of Krakow.
- Wacław (Aleksander) Maciejowski (1793–1883), Polish historian.
- Michał Maciejowski, Polish fighter ace.
- Zofia Czeska (Zofia Czeska-Maciejowska)

== See also ==
- Maciejowski Bible
- Ruda Maciejowska, a village in the administrative district
