= Willy ter Hell =

German landscape painter (1883–1947)

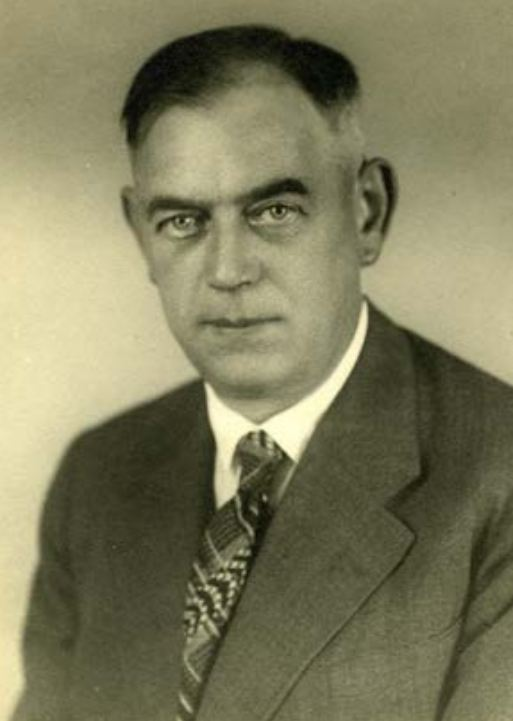
Willy ter Hell (date unknown)

Wilhelm Reemt ter Hell, known as Willy (2 December 1883, Norden – 1 July 1947 in Hofgeismar) was a German landscape painter and graphic artist.

== Life and work ==
He was the seventh of nine children born to Jan ter Hell, an auctioneer, and his wife, Aleida Harmina née Meyer; an art lover who taught her children how to draw. His older brother, Johann Hermann, became a porcelain painter. He was unable to attend art school, as he wished, due to his father's poor financial situation. As a result, he became an apprentice stage painter in Berlin. After three years, he was able to study at the Prussian Academy of Arts, with Heinrich Harder, painting panoramas and dioramas. He was eventually employed by Harder as an assistant, and took evening classes at the Kunstgewerbemuseum.

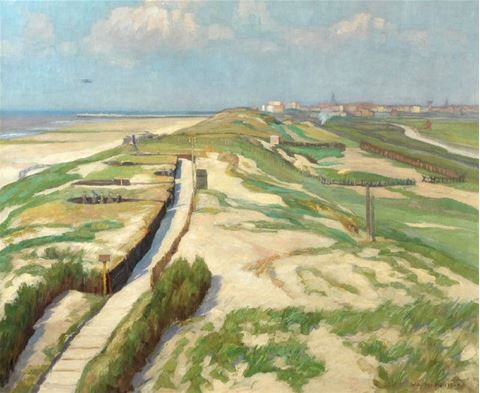
The Trenches at Normandy

Three of his works were accepted at the Große Berliner Kunstausstellung in 1906. That same year, he moved to Dresden, to study with Eugen Bracht. After winning a medal at a student exhibition in 1909, he decided to return to Berlin, where he met Margarete Starck. They were married in 1912 and had one daughter. A series of successful exhibitions followed, at the Glaspalast (1913), the Carnegie Institute (1914) and the Panama–Pacific International Exposition (1915). In addition to his paintings, he was one of a group of artists who created frescoes at the Rathaus Schöneberg. During World War I, from 1915 to 1918, he served on the front lines in Flanders and Russia. After the war, he took some time off for study trips in the summer; turning his sketches into paintings at his studio in the winter. In 1921, he visited Tyrolia and the Alps for the first time, but declined to cater to the popular demand for Alpine art; choosing to paint his usual rolling hills instead.

He joined the Nazi party in 1933, and became a voluntary employee of the Reichskulturkammer. At the Große Deutsche Kunstausstellung of 1938, he was represented by twenty-four works, some of which were acquired by Adolf Hitler and Joachim von Ribbentrop. In 1940, his painting "From the Swabian Jura", was purchased for display in the Reichskanzlei. At the exhibition of 1943, he was awarded the title of "Honorary Professor". Later that year, his studio and most of his paintings were destroyed in a bombing.

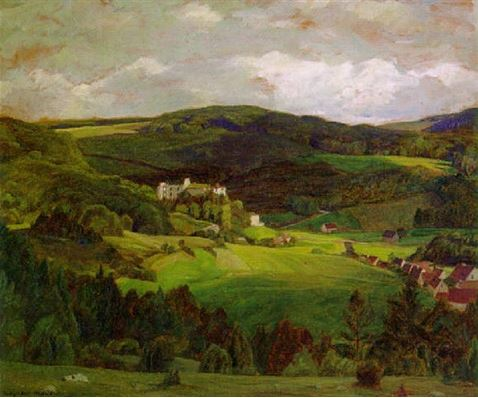
From the Swabian Jura

In 1945, he wrote to his cousin, the marine artist Poppe Folkerts, to help him with moving his remaining works to Schloss Carolath (now in Siedlisko, Poland). That same year, he fled to Turek. After the war, he and his family moved again, with no more than they could carry, to Hofgeismar, where he died of pneumonia in 1947, aged sixty-three.

== Sources ==
- "Hell, Willy", In: Allgemeines Lexikon der Bildenden Künstler von der Antike bis zur Gegenwart, Vol. 16: Hansen–Heubach, E. A. Seemann, Leipzig 1923
- "Ter Hell, Willy". In: Hans Vollmer (Ed.): Allgemeines Lexikon der bildenden Künstler des XX. Jahrhunderts, Vol.4: Q–U. E. A. Seemann, Leipzig 1958, pg.428
- Mareike Parthey, Ursula Basse-Soltau: Willy ter Hell – Ein vergessener Norder Maler. Soltau-Kurier-Norden, 2008 ISBN 978-3-939870-50-0
