= Stara Wieś, Grójec County =

Stara Wieś
- Village
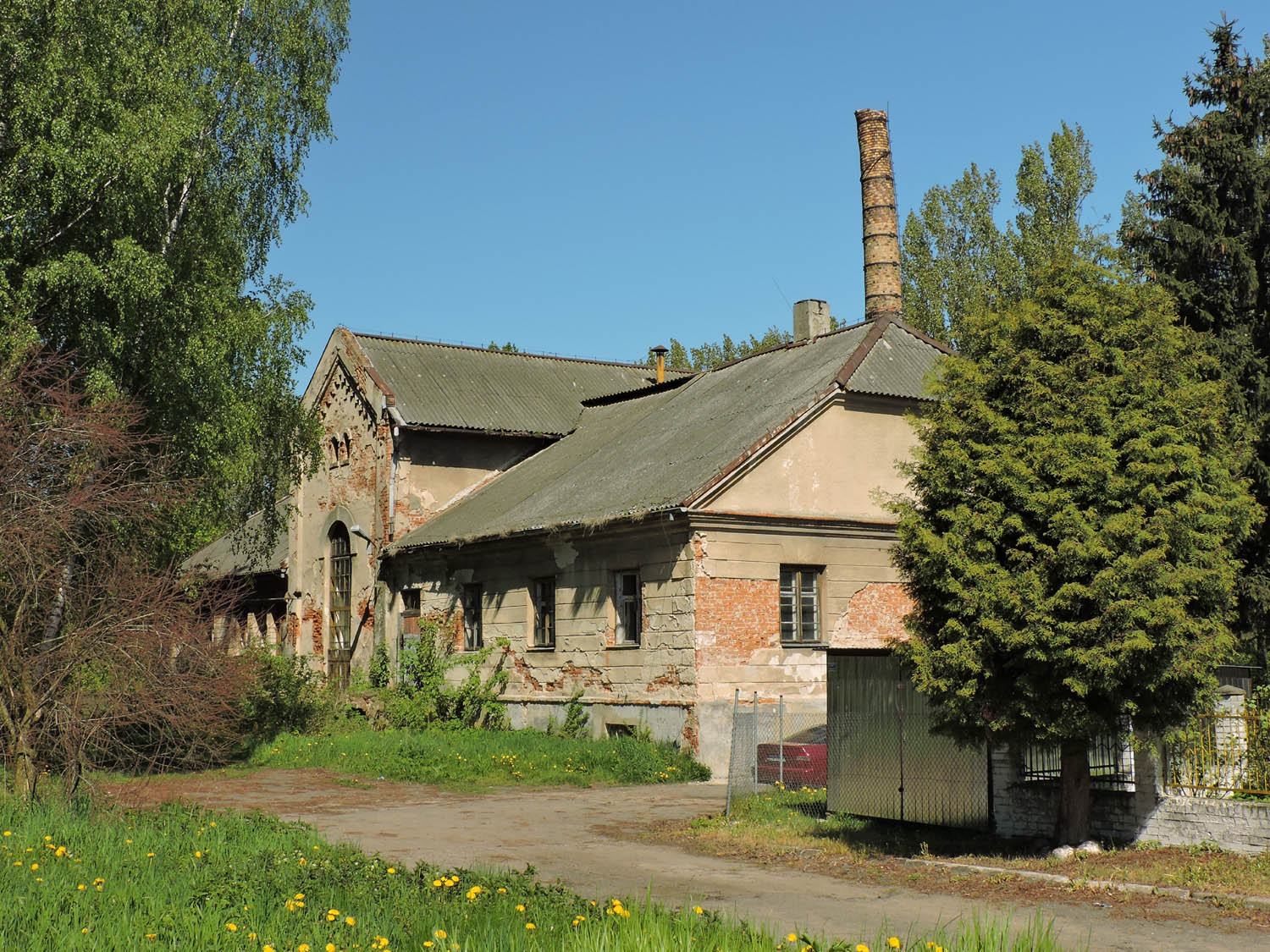

- Location within Poland
- Coordinates: 51°48′46″N 20°47′46″E
- Country: Poland
- Voivodeship: Masovian
- County: Grójec
- Gmina: Belsk Duży

Stara Wieś [ˈstara ˈvjɛɕ] is a village in the administrative district of Gmina Belsk Duży, within Grójec County, Masovian Voivodeship, in east-central Poland.
