= Wola Starowiejska =

- Village
- Location within Poland
- Coordinates: 51°48′13″N 20°48′53″E
- Country: Poland
- Voivodeship: Masovian
- County: Grójec
- Gmina: Belsk Duży

Wola Starowiejska (Polish pronunciation: [ˈvɔla starɔˈvjɛjska]) is a village in the administrative district of Gmina Belsk Duży, within Grójec County, Masovian Voivodeship, in east-central Poland.
