= Rożce =

- Village
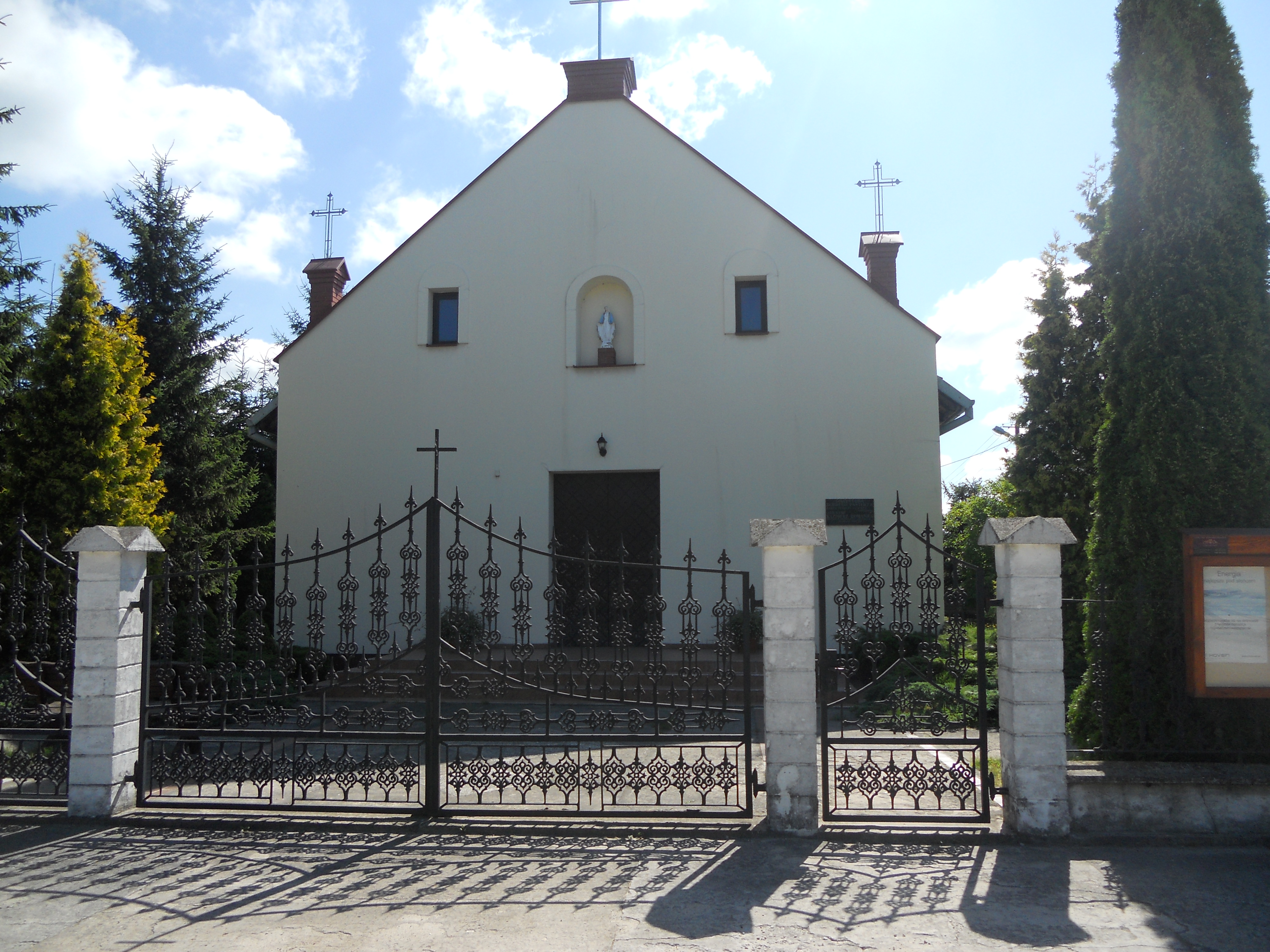
- Chapel in Rożce, Poland

- Location within Poland
- Coordinates: 51°50′33″N 20°45′08″E
- Country: Poland
- Voivodeship: Masovian
- County: Grójec
- Gmina: Belsk Duży

Rożce [ˈrɔʂt͡sɛ] is a village in the administrative district of Gmina Belsk Duży, within Grójec County, Masovian Voivodeship, in east-central Poland.
