= Zajączek, Lubusz Voivodeship =

Zajączek
- Village
- Location within Poland
- Coordinates: 51°38′N 14°56′E
- Country: Poland
- Voivodeship: Lubusz
- County: Żary
- Gmina: Lipinki Łużyckie
- Population: 205

Zajączek [zaˈjɔnt͡ʂɛk] (Lower Sorbian: Wuchacki; Upper Sorbian: Zaječk) is a village in the administrative district of Gmina Lipinki Łużyckie, within Żary County, Lubusz Voivodeship, in western Poland.
