= Pietrzyków, Lubusz Voivodeship =

Pietrzyków
- Village
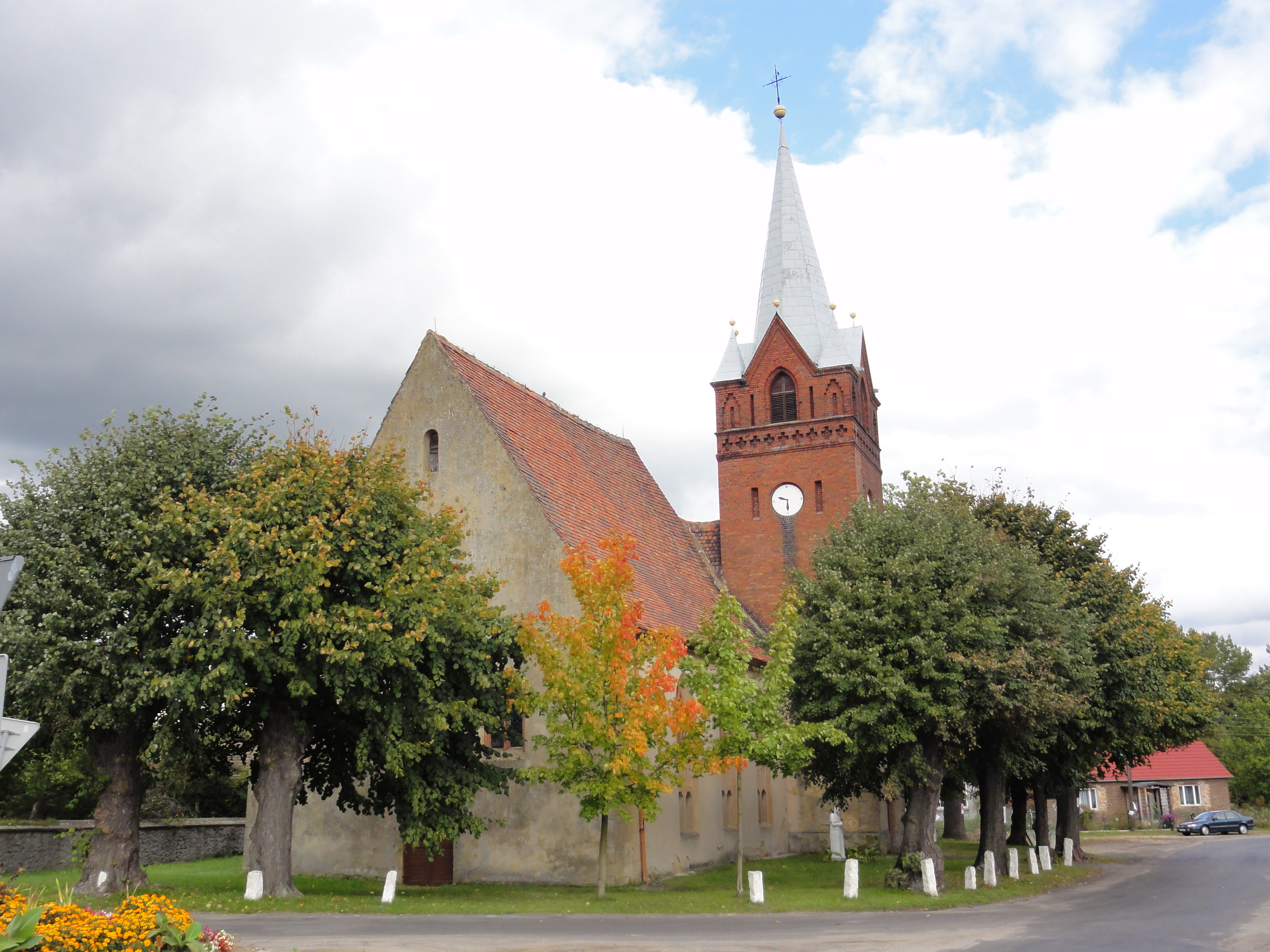
- Catholic church

- Location within Poland
- Coordinates: 51°40′N 14°58′E
- Country: Poland
- Voivodeship: Lubusz
- County: Żary
- Gmina: Lipinki Łużyckie
- Population: 276

Pietrzyków [pjɛˈtʂɨkuf] (Lower Sorbian: Pětrzyków) is a village in the administrative district of Gmina Lipinki Łużyckie, within Żary County, Lubusz Voivodeship, in western Poland.
