= Górka, Lubusz Voivodeship =

Górka
- Village
- Location within Poland
- Coordinates: 51°39′N 15°3′E
- Country: Poland
- Voivodeship: Lubusz
- County: Żary
- Gmina: Lipinki Łużyckie

Górka [ˈɡurka] (Upper Sorbian: Hórka; Lower Sorbian: Górki) is a village in the administrative district of Gmina Lipinki Łużyckie, within Żary County, Lubusz Voivodeship, in western Poland.
