= Belsk Mały =

- Village
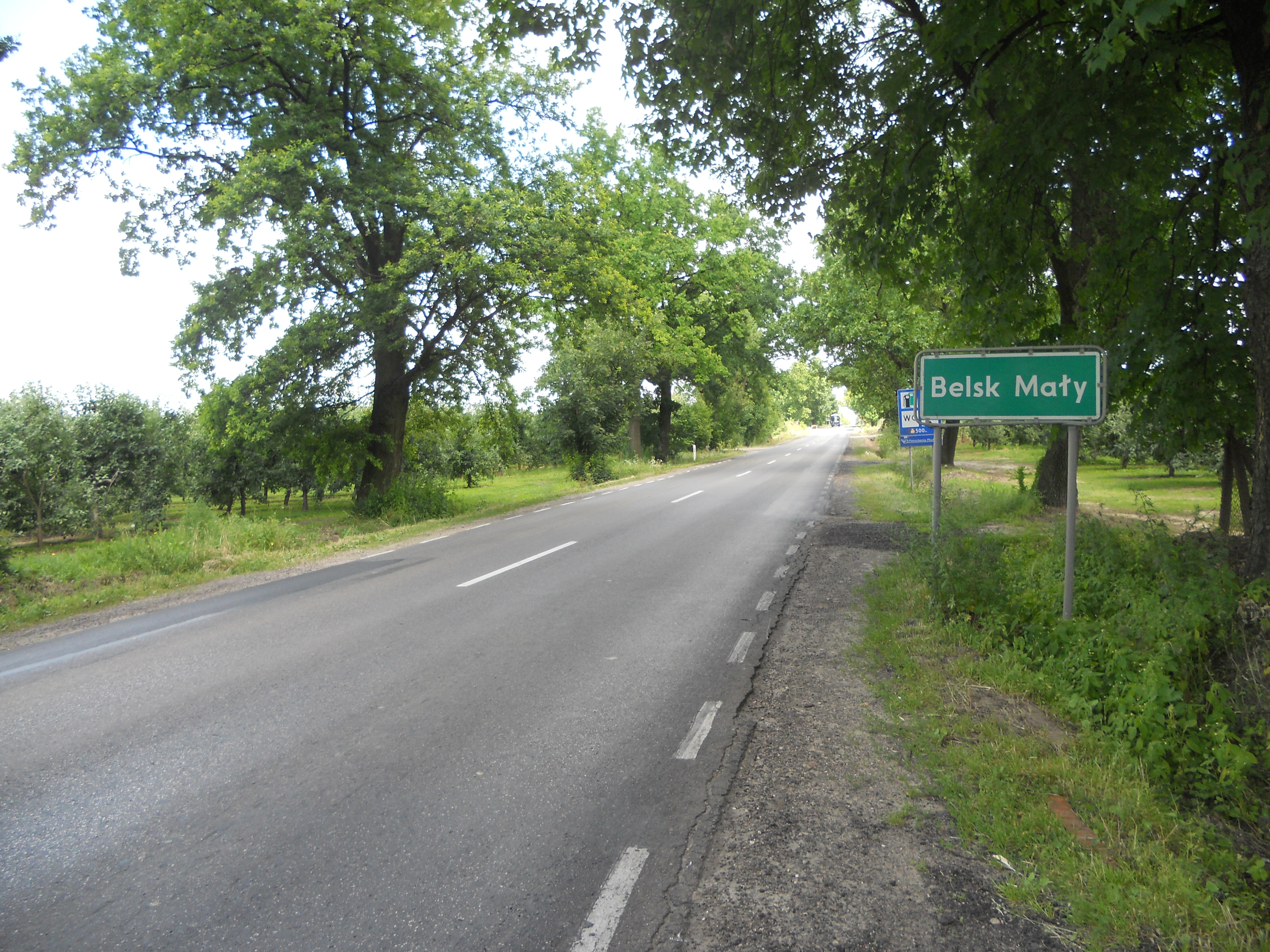
- Road heading into Belsk Mały

- Location within Poland
- Coordinates: 51°51′N 20°49′E
- Country: Poland
- Voivodeship: Masovian
- County: Grójec
- Gmina: Belsk Duży

Belsk Mały [ˈbɛlsk ˈmawɨ] is a village in the administrative district of Gmina Belsk Duży, within Grójec County, Masovian Voivodeship, in east-central Poland.
