= Oczesały =

- Village
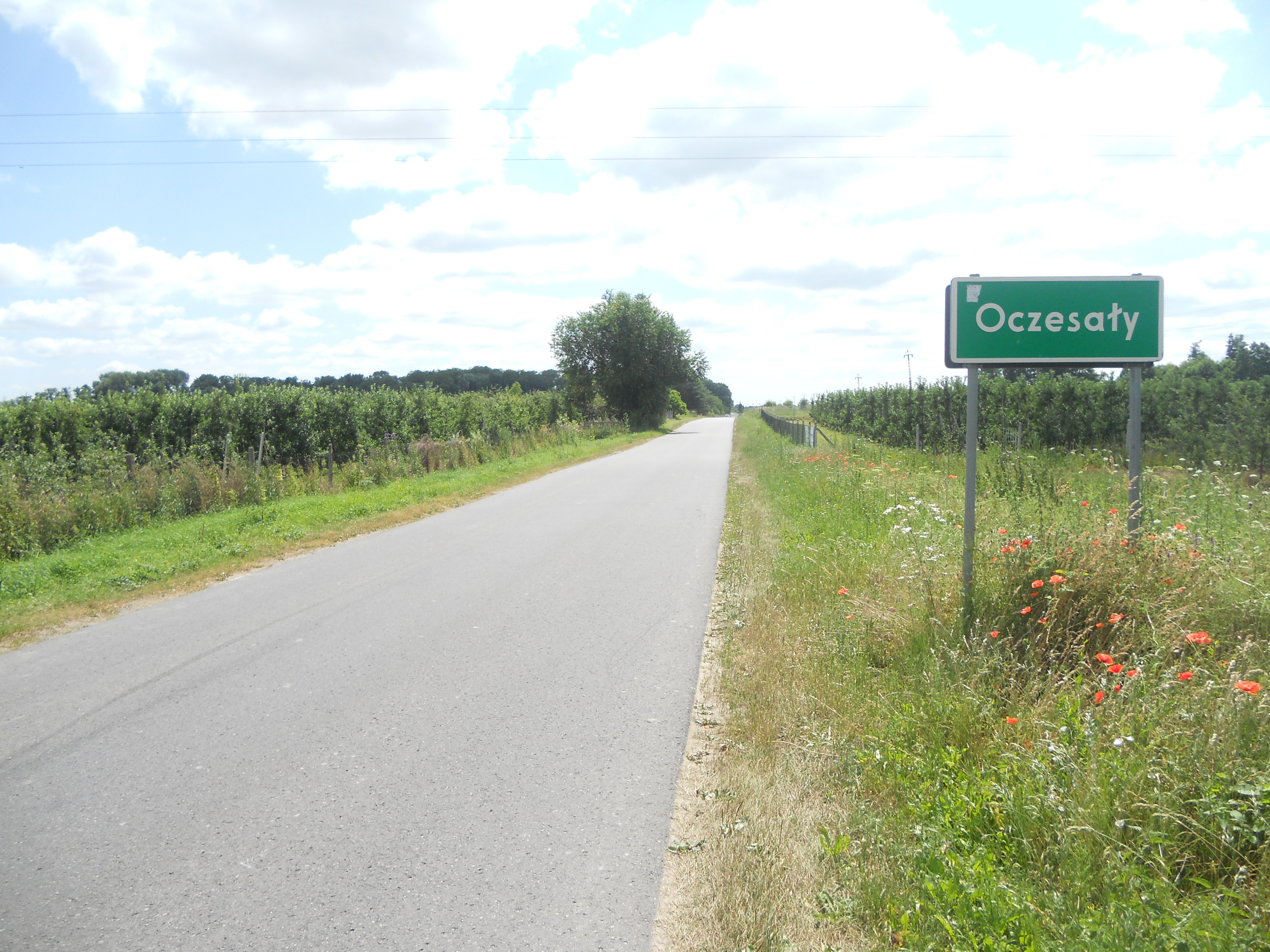

- Location within Poland
- Coordinates: 51°49′19″N 20°51′44″E
- Country: Poland
- Voivodeship: Masovian
- County: Grójec
- Gmina: Belsk Duży

Oczesały [ɔt͡ʂɛˈsawɨ] is a village in the administrative district of Gmina Belsk Duży, within Grójec County, Masovian Voivodeship, in east-central Poland.
