= Łęczeszyce =

- Village
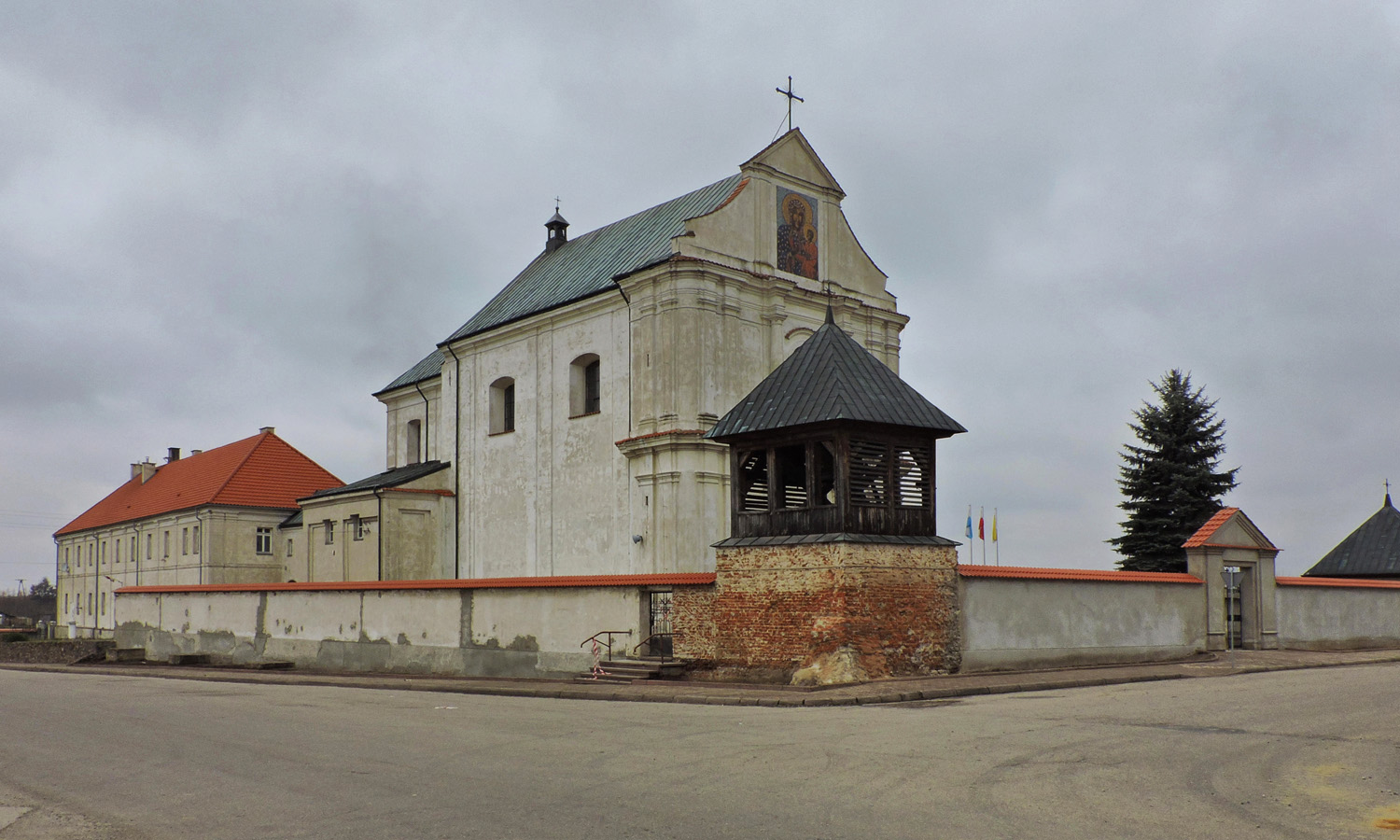
- Pauline monastery with the Church of Saint John the Baptist

- Location within Poland
- Coordinates: 51°47′N 20°47′E
- Country: Poland
- Voivodeship: Masovian
- County: Grójec
- Gmina: Belsk Duży

Population
  - Total: 560
- Time zone: UTC+1 (CET)
  - Summer (DST): UTC+2 (CEST)
- Vehicle registration: WGR

Łęczeszyce [wɛnt͡ʂɛˈʂɨt͡sɛ] is a village in the administrative district of Gmina Belsk Duży, within Grójec County, Masovian Voivodeship, in east-central Poland.

== History ==
In the early modern period, a trade route connecting Warsaw and Kraków ran through the village. It was one of the busiest routes in Poland.
