= Aleksandrówka, Grójec County =

Aleksandrówka
- Village
- Location within Poland
- Coordinates: 51°51′N 20°46′E
- Country: Poland
- Voivodeship: Masovian
- County: Grójec
- Gmina: Belsk Duży

Aleksandrówka [alɛksanˈdrufka] is a village in the administrative district of Gmina Belsk Duży, within Grójec County, Masovian Voivodeship, in east-central Poland.
