= Boruty, Grójec County =

Boruty
- Village
- Location within Poland
- Coordinates: 51°49′N 20°51′E
- Country: Poland
- Voivodeship: Masovian
- County: Grójec
- Gmina: Belsk Duży

Boruty [bɔˈrutɨ] is a village in the administrative district of Gmina Belsk Duży, within Grójec County, Masovian Voivodeship, in east-central Poland.
