= Belsk Duży =

- Village
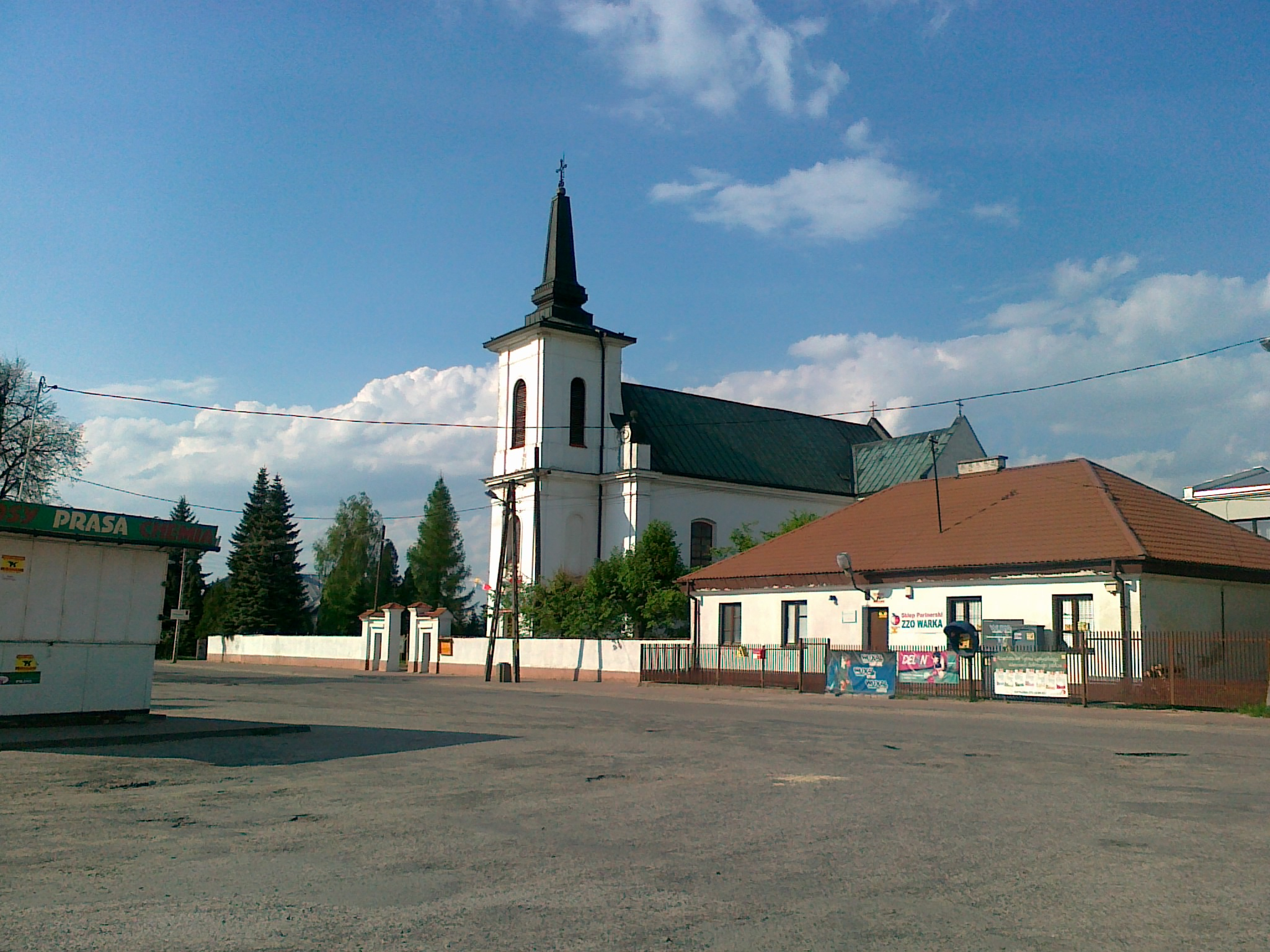
- Church of Holy Trinity

- Coat of arms

- Location within Poland
- Coordinates: 51°50′N 20°49′E
- Country: Poland
- Voivodeship: Masovian
- County: Grójec
- Gmina: Belsk Duży

Population
  - Total: 800
- Time zone: UTC+1 (CET)
  - Summer (DST): UTC+2 (CEST)
- Vehicle registration: WGR
- Website: http://www.belskduzy.pl

Belsk Duży [ˈbɛlsk ˈduʐɨ] is a village in Grójec County, Masovian Voivodeship, in east-central Poland. It is the seat of the gmina (administrative district) called Gmina Belsk Duży.

== History ==
In the early modern period, a trade route connecting Warsaw and Kraków ran through the village. It was one of the busiest routes in Poland.

== Notable people ==
- Jan Rządkowski (1860–1934), Polish general
