= Skowronki, Masovian Voivodeship =

Skowronki
- Village
- Location within Poland
- Coordinates: 51°47′52″N 20°46′45″E
- Country: Poland
- Voivodeship: Masovian
- County: Grójec
- Gmina: Belsk Duży

Skowronki [skɔˈvrɔŋki] is a village in the administrative district of Gmina Belsk Duży, within Grójec County, Masovian Voivodeship, in east-central Poland.
