= Sadków Duchowny =

- Village
- Location within Poland
- Coordinates: 51°51′25″N 20°45′27″E
- Country: Poland
- Voivodeship: Masovian
- County: Grójec
- Gmina: Belsk Duży

Sadków Duchowny [ˈsatkuf duˈxɔvnɨ] is a village in the administrative district of Gmina Belsk Duży, within Grójec County, Masovian Voivodeship, in east-central Poland.
