= Julianów, Gmina Belsk Duży =

Julianów
- Village
- Location within Poland
- Coordinates: 51°46′46″N 20°49′53″E
- Country: Poland
- Voivodeship: Masovian
- County: Grójec
- Gmina: Belsk Duży

Julianów [juˈljanuf] is a village in the administrative district of Gmina Belsk Duży, within Grójec County, Masovian Voivodeship, in east-central Poland.
