= Wilczy Targ =

- Village
- Location within Poland
- Coordinates: 51°48′N 20°55′E
- Country: Poland
- Voivodeship: Masovian
- County: Grójec
- Gmina: Belsk Duży

Wilczy Targ [ˈvilt͡ʂɨ ˈtark] is a village in the administrative district of Gmina Belsk Duży, within Grójec County, Masovian Voivodeship, in east-central Poland.
