= Suchleb =

- Village
- Location within Poland
- Coordinates: 51°37′N 15°0′E
- Country: Poland
- Voivodeship: Lubusz
- County: Żary
- Gmina: Lipinki Łużyckie

Suchleb [ˈsuxlɛp] (Upper Sorbian: Pytanski Leb) is a village in the administrative district of Gmina Lipinki Łużyckie, within Żary County, Lubusz Voivodeship, in western Poland.
