= Gmina Belsk Duży =

Gmina Belsk Duży Belsk Duży Commune
- Gmina
- Coat of arms
- Interactive map of Gmina Belsk Duży
- Coordinates (Belsk Duży): 51°50′N 20°49′E
- Country: Poland
- Voivodeship: Masovian
- County: Grójec
- Seat: Belsk Duży

Area
  - Total: 107.84 km^{2} (41.64 sq mi)

Population (2006)
  - Total: 6,793
  - Density: 62.99/km^{2} (163.1/sq mi)
- Website: http://belskduzy.pl

Gmina Belsk Duży is a rural gmina (administrative district) in Grójec County, Masovian Voivodeship, in east-central Poland. Its seat is the village of Belsk Duży, which lies approximately 5 kilometres (3 mi) south-west of Grójec and 45 km (28 mi) south of Warsaw.

The gmina covers an area of 107.84 square kilometres (41.6 sq mi), and as of 2006 its total population is 6,793.

== Villages ==
Gmina Belsk Duży contains the villages and settlements of Aleksandrówka, Anielin, Bartodzieje, Belsk Duży, Belsk Mały, Bodzew, Boruty, Grotów, Jarochy, Julianów, Koziel, Kussy, Łęczeszyce, Lewiczyn, Maciejówka, Mała Wieś, Oczesały, Odrzywołek, Rębowola, Rosochów, Rożce, Sadków Duchowny, Sadków-Kolonia, Skowronki, Stara Wieś, Tartaczek, Widów, Wilczogóra, Wilczy Targ, Wola Łęczeszycka, Wola Starowiejska, Wólka Łęczeszycka, Zaborów and Zaborówek.

== Neighbouring gminas ==
Gmina Belsk Duży is bordered by the gminas of Błędów, Goszczyn, Grójec, Jasieniec, Mogielnica and Pniewy.
