= Wólka Łęczeszycka =

- Village
- Location within Poland
- Coordinates: 51°47′N 20°47′E
- Country: Poland
- Voivodeship: Masovian
- County: Grójec
- Gmina: Belsk Duży

Wólka Łęczeszycka [ˈvulka wɛnt͡ʂɛˈʂɨt͡ska] is a village in the administrative district of Gmina Belsk Duży, within Grójec County, Masovian Voivodeship, in east-central Poland.
