= Lewiczyn, Grójec County =

Lewiczyn
- Village
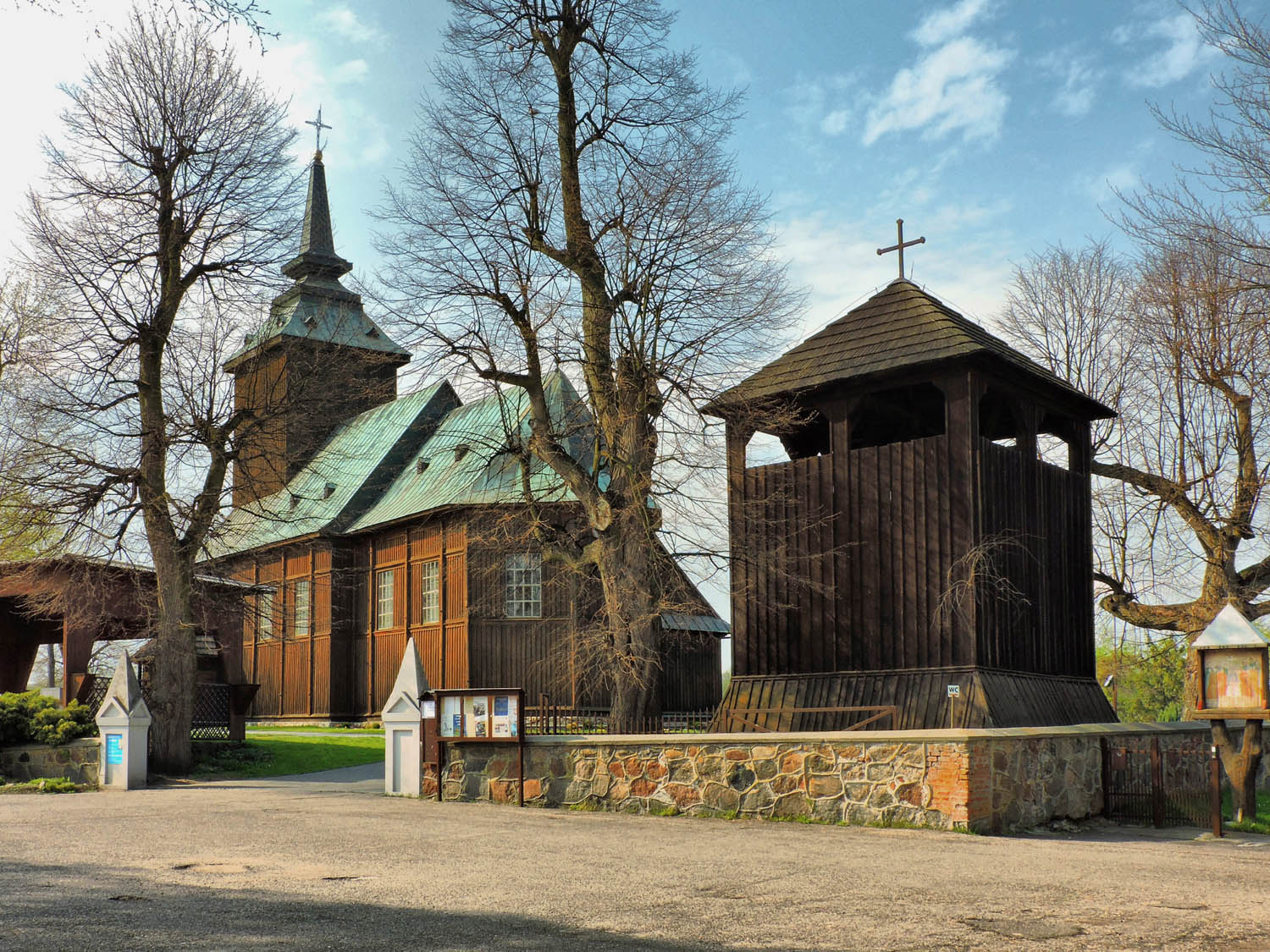
- Church of Saint Adalbert

- Location within Poland
- Coordinates: 51°48′N 20°52′E
- Country: Poland
- Voivodeship: Masovian
- County: Grójec
- Gmina: Belsk Duży

Population
  - Total: 460

Lewiczyn [lɛˈvit͡ʂɨn] is a village in the administrative district of Gmina Belsk Duży, within Grójec County, Masovian Voivodeship, in east-central Poland.
