= Gmina Lipinki Łużyckie =

Gmina Lipinki Łużyckie Lipinki Łużyckie Commune
- Gmina
- Flag Coat of arms
- Interactive map of Gmina Lipinki Łużyckie
- Coordinates (Lipinki Łużyckie): 51°38′41″N 15°0′35″E
- Country: Poland
- Voivodeship: Lubusz
- County: Żary
- Seat: Lipinki Łużyckie

Area
  - Total: 88.55 km^{2} (34.19 sq mi)

Population (2019-06-30)
  - Total: 3,366
  - Density: 38.01/km^{2} (98.45/sq mi)
- Website: http://www.lipinki-luzyckie.pl

Gmina Lipinki Łużyckie is a rural gmina (administrative district) in Żary County, Lubusz Voivodeship, in western Poland. Its seat is the village of Lipinki Łużyckie, which lies approximately 9 kilometres (6 mi) west of Żary and 48 km (30 mi) south-west of Zielona Góra.

The gmina covers an area of 88.55 square kilometres (34.2 sq mi), and as of 2019 its total population is 3,366.

== Villages ==
Gmina Lipinki Łużyckie contains the villages and settlements of Boruszyn, Brzostowa, Cisowa, Górka, Grotów, Lipinki Łużyckie, Pietrzyków, Piotrowice, Sieciejów, Suchleb, Tyliczki and Zajączek.

== Neighbouring gminas ==
Gmina Lipinki Łużyckie is bordered by the gminas of Jasień, Przewóz, Trzebiel, Tuplice and Żary.
