= Zaborów, Grójec County =

Zaborów
- Village
- Location within Poland
- Coordinates: 51°47′N 20°53′E
- Country: Poland
- Voivodeship: Masovian
- County: Grójec
- Gmina: Belsk Duży

Zaborów [zaˈbɔruf] is a village in the administrative district of Gmina Belsk Duży, within Grójec County, Masovian Voivodeship, in east-central Poland. There is grocery and primary school in Zaborów.
