= Boruszyn, Lubusz Voivodeship =

Boruszyn
- Village
- Location within Poland
- Coordinates: 51°37′N 14°57′E
- Country: Poland
- Voivodeship: Lubusz
- County: Żary
- Gmina: Lipinki Łużyckie
- Population: 220

Boruszyn [bɔˈruʂɨn] is a village in the administrative district of Gmina Lipinki Łużyckie, within Żary County, Lubusz Voivodeship, in western Poland.
