= Johann Carl Friedrich zu Carolath-Beuthen =

Johann Karl Friedrich zu Carolath-Beuthen (sometimes called von Schoenaich-Carolath and sometimes Friedrich Johann Carl) (11 November 1716 in Carolath – 10 February 1791) was an independent prince and Prussian general in the service of Frederick the Great.

== Early life and ancestry ==
Born into the Prussian House of Schoenaich-Carolath, he was the eldest child of Prince Hans Carl zu Carolath-Beuthen (1689-1763) and his wife, Countess Amalia zu Dohna-Schlodien (1692-1761).

== Military service ==
In 1741, after service in the imperial army, Carolath-Beuthen entered Prussian service. He was a lieutenant colonel in a life carabiner regiment. In 1743, he was colonel and commander of the Curassier regiment Nr. 8. He served most notably at the Battle of Hohenfriedberg. In the same year, Frederick awarded him the Order Pour le Mérite. In 1751 he received his own cuirassier regiment, No. 9., and began the Seven Years' War as a lieutenant general.
