= Cisowa, Lubusz Voivodeship =

Cisowa
- Village
- Location within Poland
- Coordinates: 51°37′17″N 14°56′18″E
- Country: Poland
- Voivodeship: Lubusz
- County: Żary
- Gmina: Lipinki Łużyckie
- Population: 52

Cisowa [t͡ɕiˈsɔva] (German: Zeisdorf) is a village in the administrative district of Gmina Lipinki Łużyckie, within Żary County, Lubusz Voivodeship, in western Poland.
