= Rosochów =

- Village
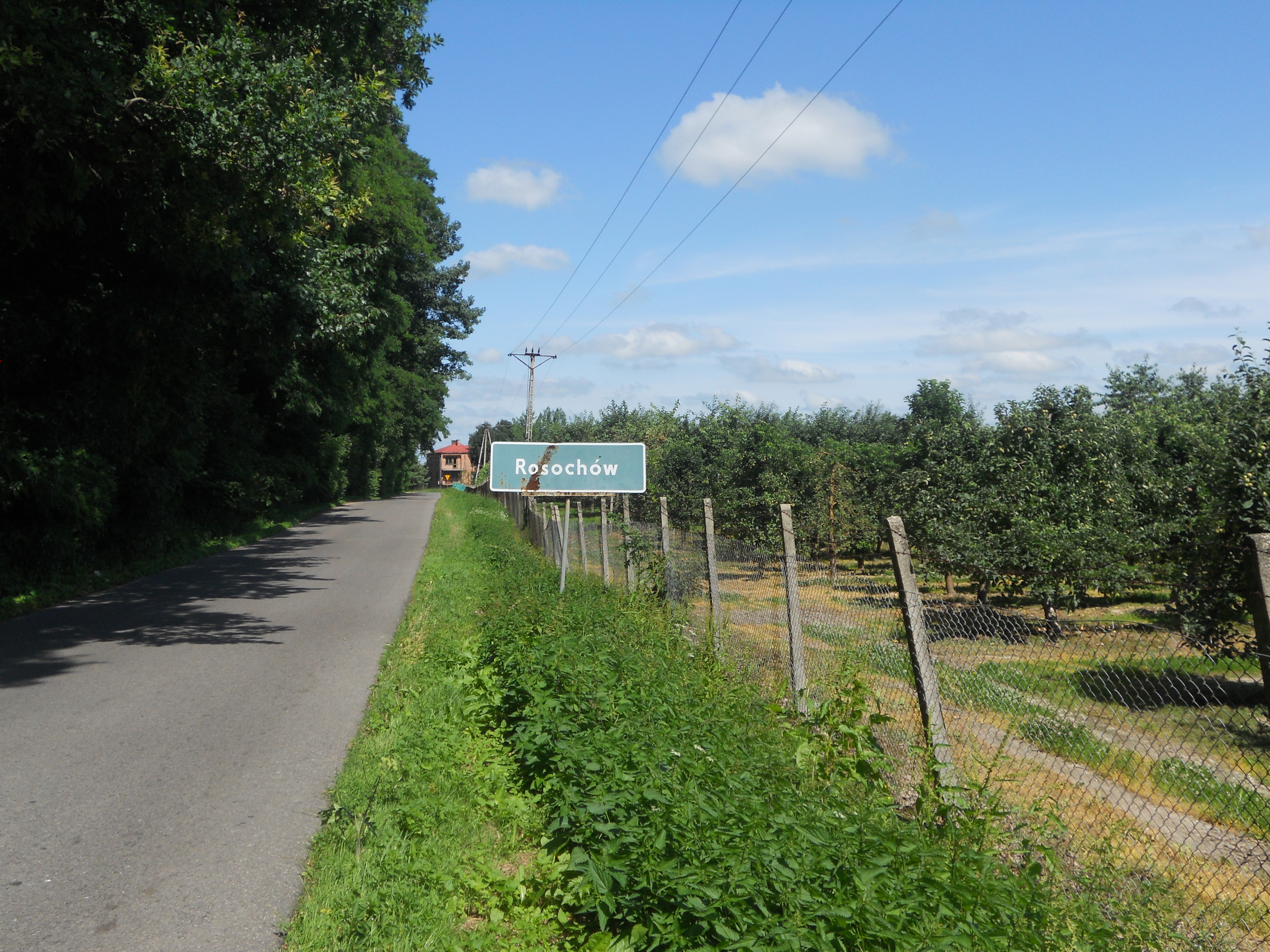
- Street in Rosochów, Poland

- Location within Poland
- Coordinates: 51°51′03″N 20°46′42″E
- Country: Poland
- Voivodeship: Masovian
- County: Grójec
- Gmina: Belsk Duży

Rosochów [rɔˈsɔxuf] is a village in the administrative district of Gmina Belsk Duży, within Grójec County, Masovian Voivodeship, in east-central Poland.
