= Bodzew =

- Village
- Location within Poland
- Coordinates: 51°49′N 20°49′E
- Country: Poland
- Voivodeship: Masovian
- County: Grójec
- Gmina: Belsk Duży

Bodzew [ˈbɔd͡zɛf] is a village in the administrative district of Gmina Belsk Duży, within Grójec County, Masovian Voivodeship, in east-central Poland. According to 2011 census, it had a population of 96 people.
