= Anielin, Grójec County =

Anielin
- Village
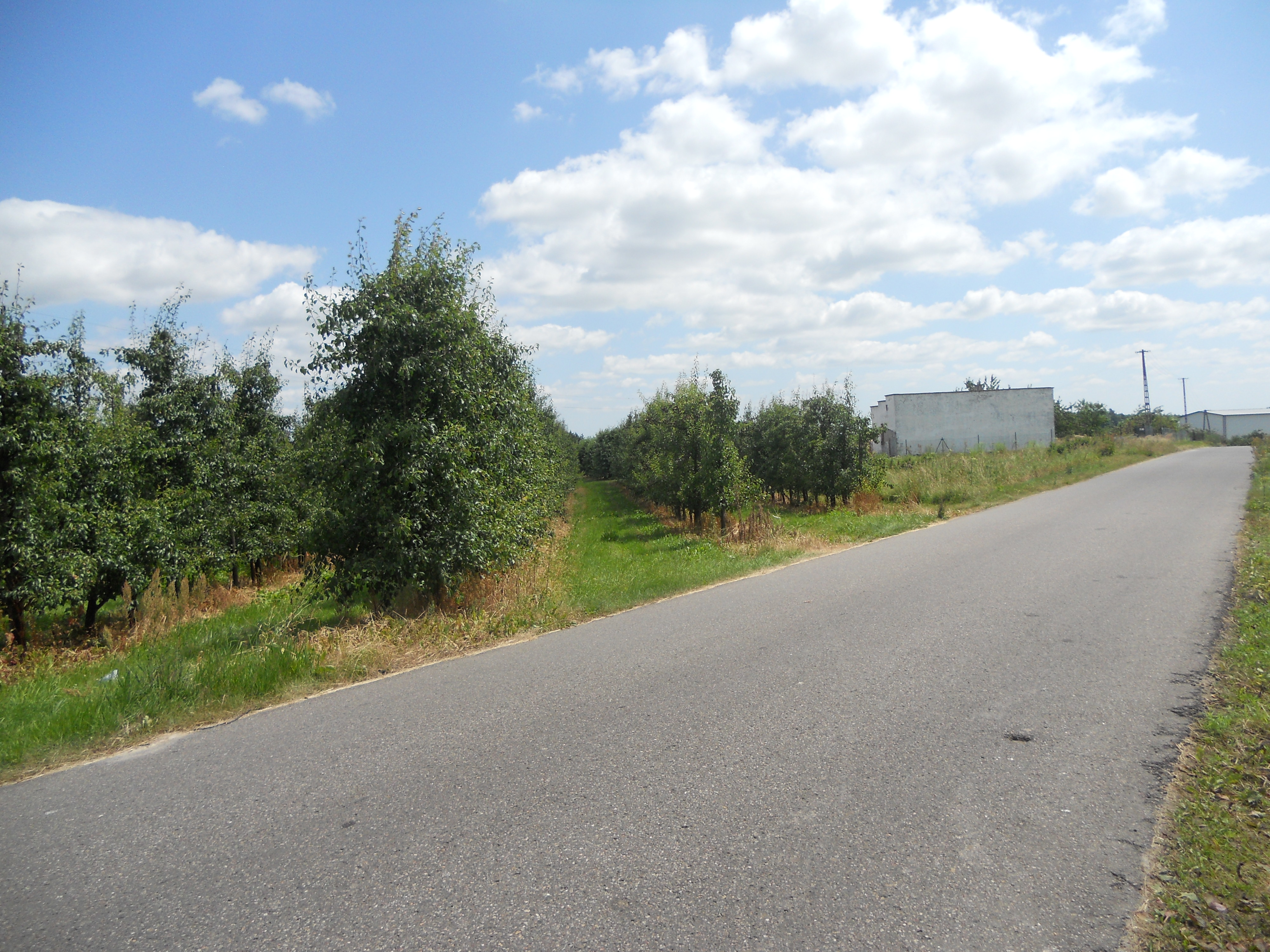

- Location within Poland
- Coordinates: 51°49′39″N 20°50′4″E
- Country: Poland
- Voivodeship: Masovian
- County: Grójec
- Gmina: Belsk Duży

Anielin [aˈɲɛlin] is a village in the administrative district of Gmina Belsk Duży, within Grójec County, Masovian Voivodeship, in east-central Poland.
