= Brzostowa =

- Village
- Location within Poland
- Coordinates: 51°40′N 15°0′E
- Country: Poland
- Voivodeship: Lubusz
- County: Żary
- Gmina: Lipinki Łużyckie

Brzostowa [bʐɔsˈtɔva] is a village in the administrative district of Gmina Lipinki Łużyckie, within Żary County, Lubusz Voivodeship, in western Poland.
