= Tyliczki =

- Village
- Location within Poland
- Coordinates: 51°39′N 14°58′E
- Country: Poland
- Voivodeship: Lubusz
- County: Żary
- Gmina: Lipinki Łużyckie

Tyliczki [tɨˈlit͡ʂki] (Lower Sorbian: Slězny Bok; Upper Sorbian: Zadni Bok) is a village in the administrative district of Gmina Lipinki Łużyckie, within Żary County, Lubusz Voivodeship, in western Poland.
