= Koziel, Masovian Voivodeship =

Koziel
- Village
- Location within Poland
- Coordinates: 51°46′12″N 20°44′32″E
- Country: Poland
- Voivodeship: Masovian
- County: Grójec
- Gmina: Belsk Duży

Koziel [ˈkɔʑɛl] is a village in the administrative district of Gmina Belsk Duży, within Grójec County, Masovian Voivodeship, in east-central Poland.
