= Grotów, Masovian Voivodeship =

Grotów
- Village
- Location within Poland
- Coordinates: 51°48′39″N 20°50′10″E
- Country: Poland
- Voivodeship: Masovian
- County: Grójec
- Gmina: Belsk Duży

Grotów [ˈɡrɔtuf] is a village in the administrative district of Gmina Belsk Duży, within Grójec County, Masovian Voivodeship, in east-central Poland.
