= Gębice, Gmina Gubin =

Gębice
- Village
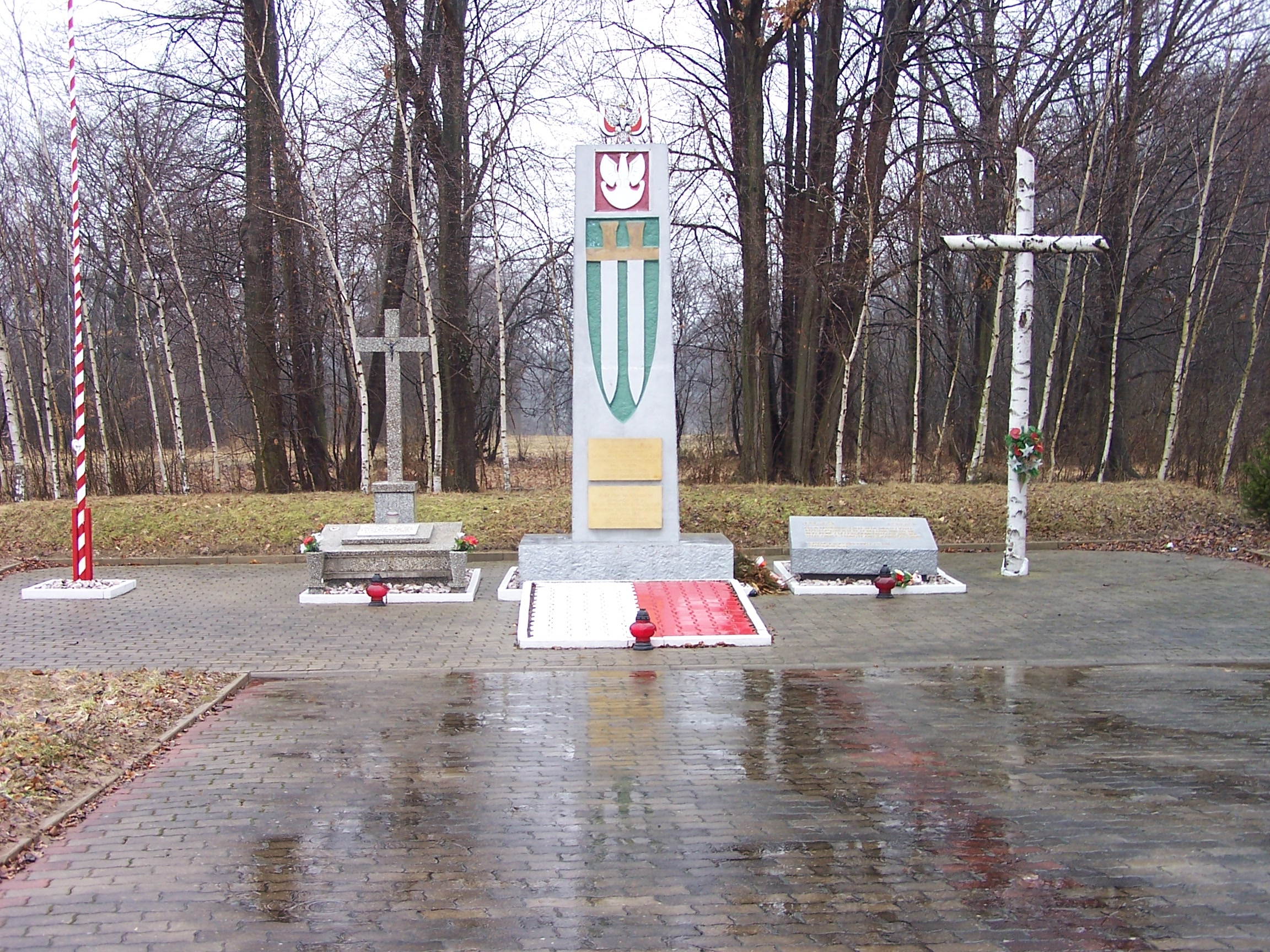
- Memorial to the prisoners of the Nazi German POW camp

- Location within Poland
- Coordinates: 51°52′N 14°49′E
- Country: Poland
- Voivodeship: Lubusz
- County: Krosno
- Gmina: Gubin
- Time zone: UTC+1 (CET)
  - Summer (DST): UTC+2 (CEST)
- Vehicle registration: FKR

Gębice ([ɡɛmˈbit͡sɛ]; German: Amtitz; Lower Sorbian: Homśica) is a village in the administrative district of Gmina Gubin, within Krosno County, Lubusz Voivodeship, in western Poland, close to the German border.

During World War II, in 1939, Nazi Germany established and operated a temporary prisoner-of-war camp for Poles in the village. Also Polish civilians and clergy were held in the camp, including Maximilian Kolbe, Franciscan friar and saint of the Catholic Church, later killed in the Auschwitz concentration camp. In October 1939, there were over 25,000 prisoners in the camp, which was infamous for its terrible conditions, and prisoners were subjected to tortures and starvation. There is a memorial to the victims.
