= Rechenberg =

Rechenberg is a surname. Notable people with the surname include:

- Albrecht von Rechenberg (1861–1935), German jurist, diplomat and a politician
- Hans Albrecht von Rechenberg (1892–1953), German politician, FDP, Bundestag
- Helmut Rechenberg (1937–2016), German physicist and science historian
- Ingo Rechenberg (1934–2021), German researcher and professor in the field of bionics
- Nikolai von Rechenberg (1846–1908), Finnish lieutenant general
