= Siedlisko, Nowa Sól County =

Siedlisko
- Village
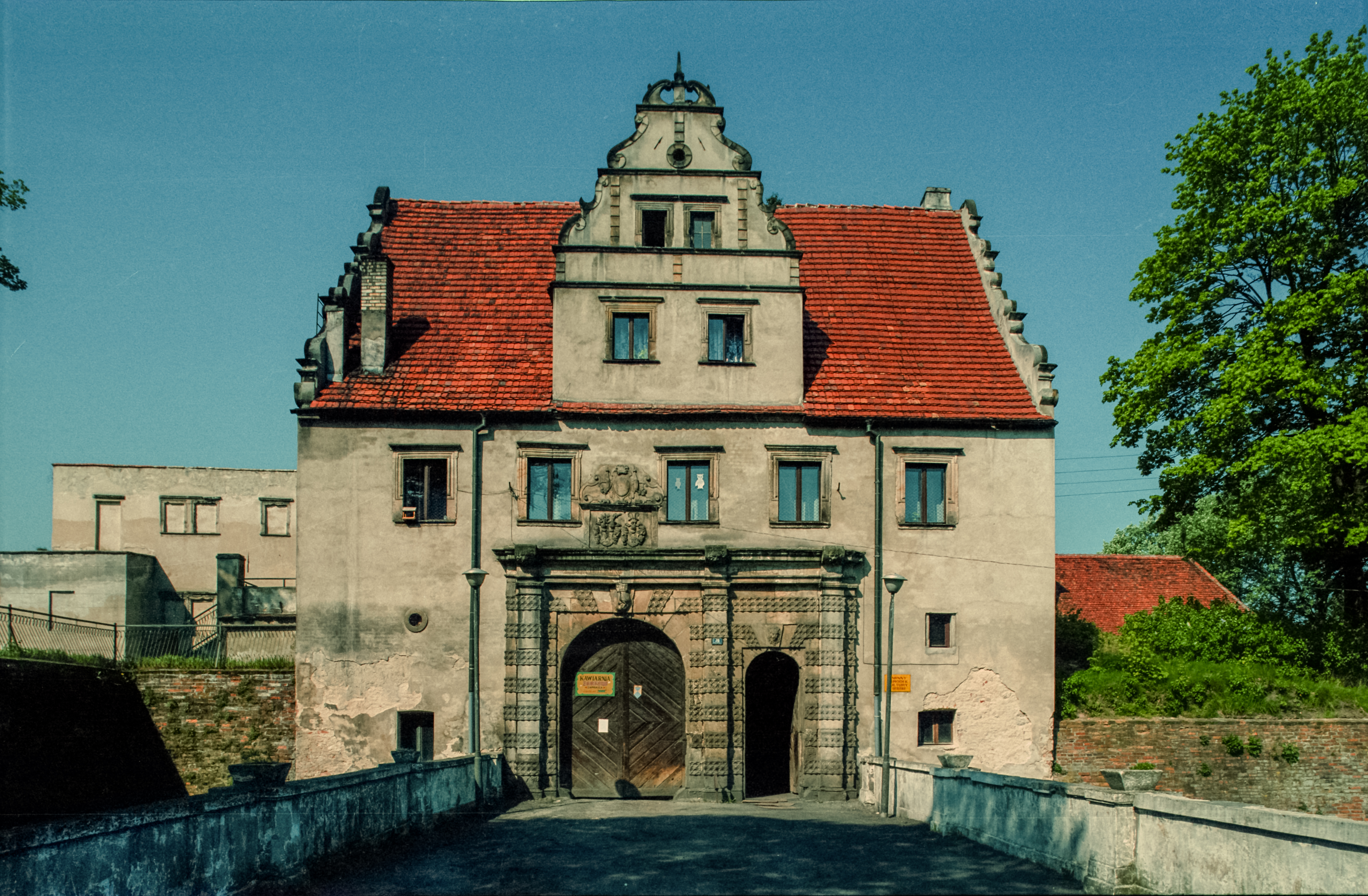
- Castle gate

- Location within Poland
- Coordinates: 51°46′N 15°49′E
- Country: Poland
- Voivodeship: Lubusz
- County: Nowa Sól
- Gmina: Siedlisko
- First mentioned: 1298

Population (approx.)
  - Total: 1,800
- Vehicle registration: FNW

Siedlisko [ɕɛˈdliskɔ] is a village on the Oder river in Nowa Sól County, Lubusz Voivodeship, in western Poland. It is the seat of the gmina (administrative district) called Gmina Siedlisko.

== History ==
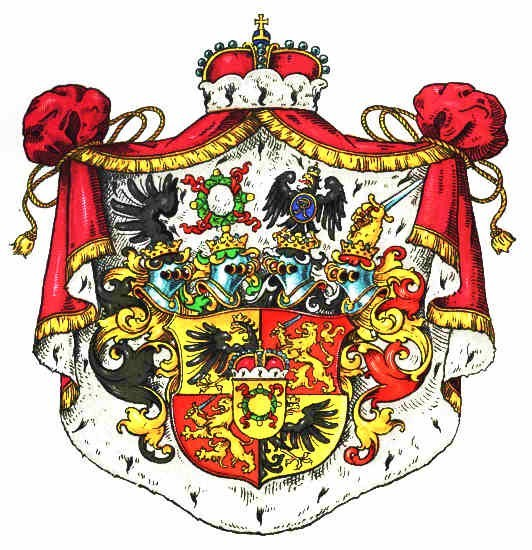
Coat of arms of the Princes of Carolath-Beuthen, as part of the Prussian nobility (1741)

The area became part of the emerging Polish state in the 10th century. Following the fragmentation of Poland into smaller provincial duchies, it formed part of the duchies of Silesia and Głogów, still ruled by the Piast dynasty. The castle of Sedlischo was first mentioned in a 1298 deed, when Duke Henry III of Głogów acquired it from the castellans at Bytom Odrzański. After the Duchy of Głogów had become a Bohemian fief in 1331, it was seized by the royal House of Luxembourg, who enfeoffed several noble families with Siedlisko. In 1561 the lordship passed to Fabian von Schoenaich, whose nephew Georg had the Renaissance Carolath Castle built and received the title of a Freiherr (Baron) from Emperor Rudolf II of Habsburg. In 1697 the Schoenaich possessions around Carolath and Bytom Odrzański were raised to the status of a Bohemian state country by decree of Emperor Leopold I.

The Schoenaichs retained their estates even after the annexation of Silesia by King Frederick II of Prussia in 1742. At the end of Silesian Wars, Freiherr Hans Carl, a devoted Protestant, immediately paid homage to the new ruler and in turn received the title of a Prince of Carolath-Beuthen on 6 November 1741. From 1871, the village also formed part of Germany. The castle burnt down after the Red Army had occupied the area at the end of World War II. A Renaissance gate building and a mausoleum designed by Hans Poelzig in 1912 are preserved. After the war, the village became again part of Poland, and its historic Polish name Siedlisko was restored.

== Economy and cuisine ==
Siedlisko produces a variety of cheeses and quarks, designated traditional foods by the Ministry of Agriculture and Rural Development of Poland, including cow's and goat's milk ripened cheeses, goat's castle cheese (Ser kozi zamkowy; named after the local castle), cow's and goat's milk cottage cheese, and goat's milk ripened quark.

== Notable people ==
- Johann Carl Friedrich zu Carolath-Beuthen (1716–1791), German nobleman and prussian general
- Hermine zu Schoenaich-Carolath, German noblewoman
- Ignaz Aurelius Fessler (1756-1839), Hungarian cleric, stayed at Carolath as an educator 1790/91
- Wolfgang Fischer (1888 –1943), German general
- Georg August Pritzel (1815–1874), German librarian
