= Matějovský =

Matějovský (feminine: Matějovská) is a Czech surname. Notable people with the surname include:

- Marek Matějovský (born 1981), Czech footballer
- Michal Matějovský (born 1985), Czech auto racer
- Radek Matějovský (born 1977), Czech ice hockey player
- Zdeněk Matějovský, Czech slalom canoeist
