= Sieciejów =

- Village
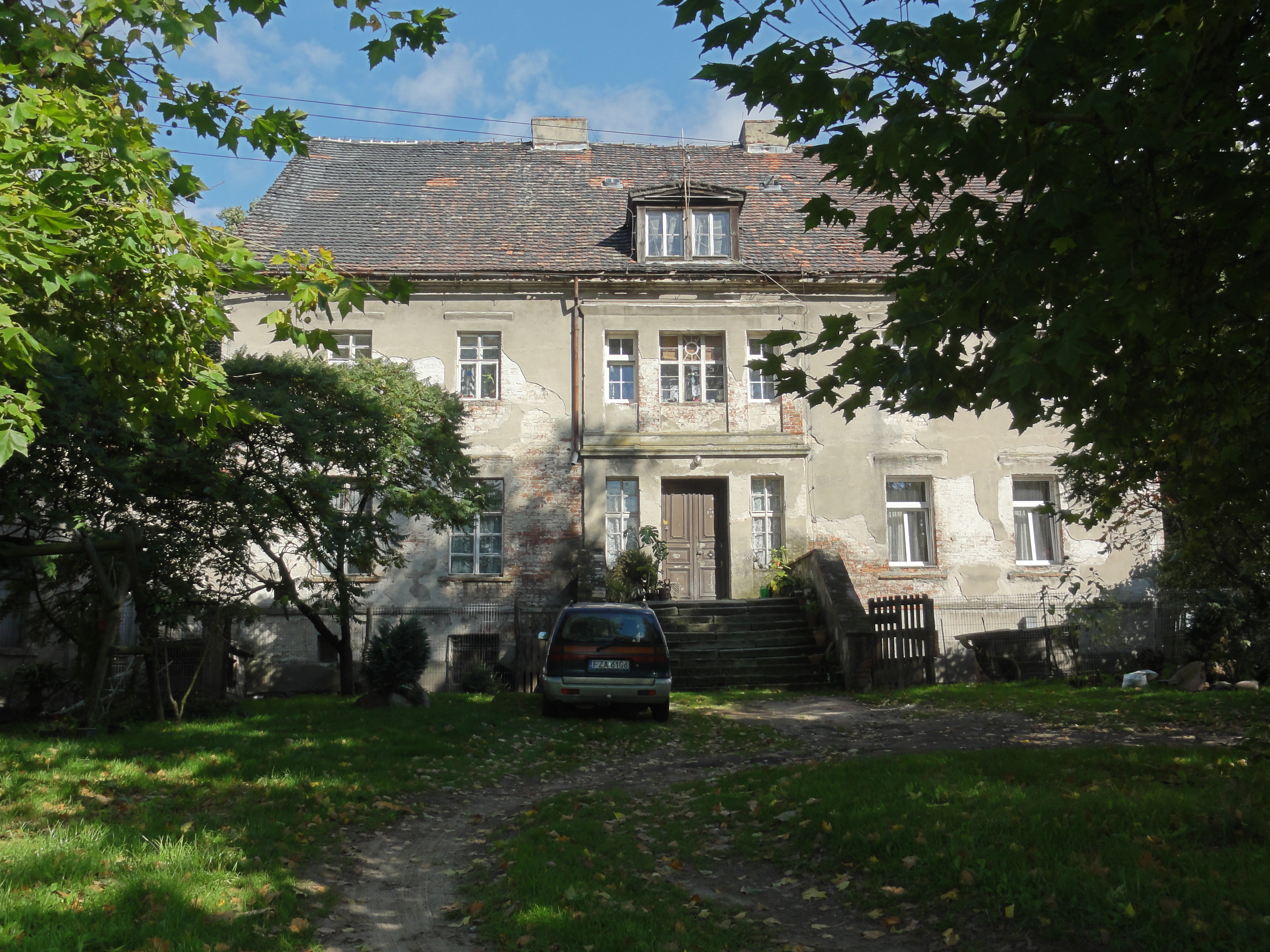
- Manor

- Location within Poland
- Coordinates: 51°40′N 15°1′E
- Country: Poland
- Voivodeship: Lubusz
- County: Żary
- Gmina: Lipinki Łużyckie

Sieciejów [ɕɛˈt͡ɕɛjuf] is a village in the administrative district of Gmina Lipinki Łużyckie, within Żary County, Lubusz Voivodeship, in western Poland.
