= Grotów, Żary County =

Grotów
- Village
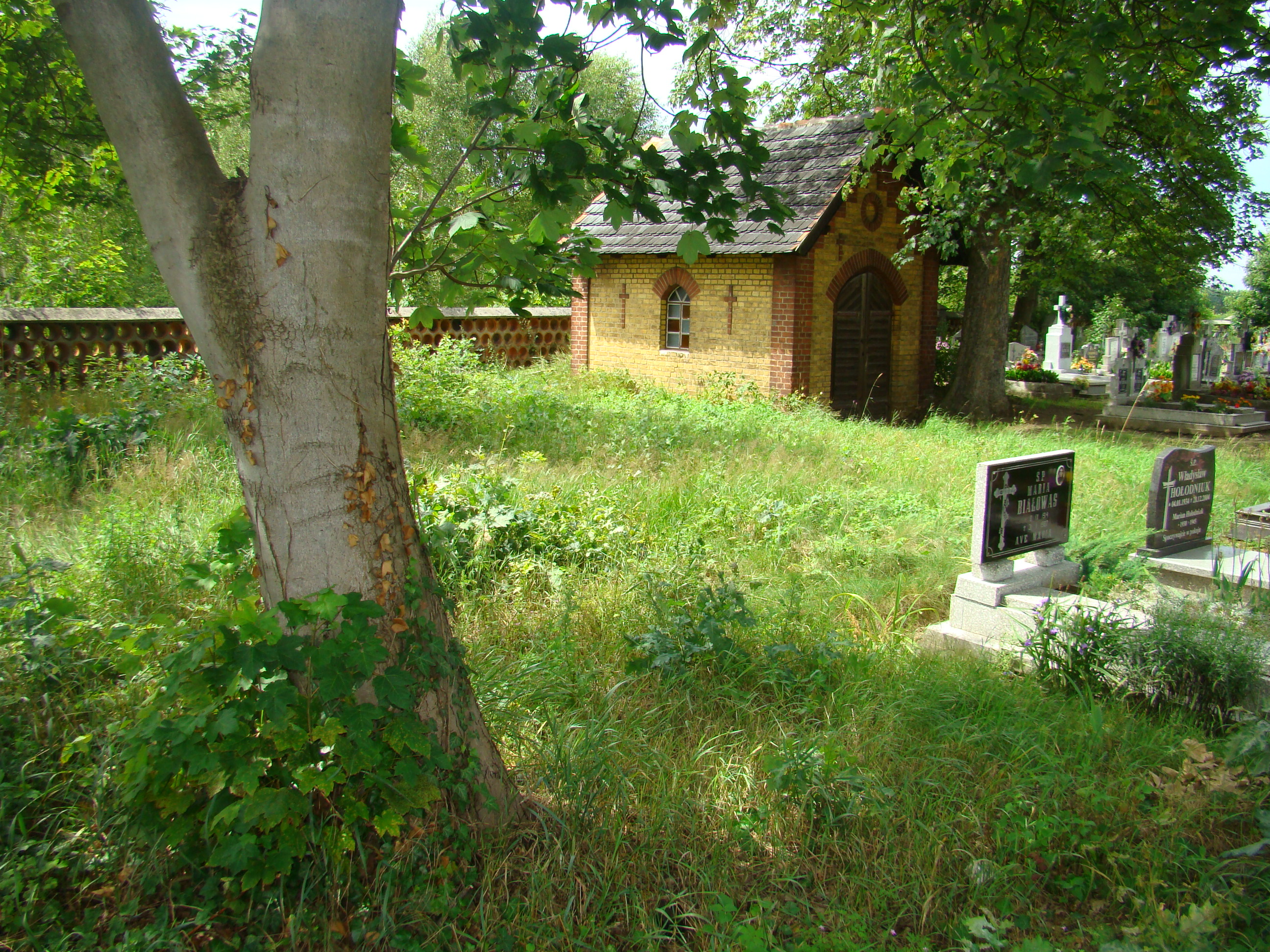
- Cemetery

- Location within Poland
- Coordinates: 51°36′0″N 14°56′55″E
- Country: Poland
- Voivodeship: Lubusz
- County: Żary
- Gmina: Lipinki Łużyckie

Grotów [ˈɡrɔtuf] (Upper Sorbian: Kłokowy końčk; Lower Sorbian: Šypkowy kóńc) is a village in the administrative district of Gmina Lipinki Łużyckie, within Żary County, Lubusz Voivodeship, in western Poland.

== Geography ==
Laid out as a typical Waldhufendorf, Grotów lies within the historical region of Lower Silesia, close to the border with Lower Lusatia in the northwest, approximately 14 km (9 mi) west of Żary and 54 km (34 mi) south-west of Zielona Góra.

== History ==
The village was founded in the 13th century by German settlers in the course of the medieval Ostsiedlung migration. Greiffenhayn was first mentioned in a 1283 deed, it was acquired by the Augustine Canons Regular at Żagań in 1388. Against their resistance, it became part of the Silesian Duchy of Żagań under the Piast duke Jan I, after his father-in-law Elector Rudolf III of Saxony had devastated the settlement. The Canons Regular suppressed the Protestant Reformation, which was not introduced until the area was conquered by Prussia during the First Silesian War in 1742. A Protestant church was erected in 1830.
