= The Prince of Homburg =

The Prince of Homburg, or in German Der Prinz von Homburg or Prinz Friedrich von Homburg, can refer to the following:

== People ==
- Frederick II, Landgrave of Hesse-Homburg (1633–1708), also known as Prince Friedrich of Homburg (Prinz Friedrich von Homburg)

== Artistic works ==
- The Prince of Homburg (play) (German: Der Prinz von Homburg, Prinz Friedrich von Homburg, or in full Prinz Friedrich von Homburg oder die Schlacht bei Fehrbellin), a play written 1809/10 by Heinrich von Kleist about the above
- Der Prinz von Homburg (opera), an opera by Hans Werner Henze, written 1958
- The Prince of Homburg (film) (Italian: Il principe di Homburg), a film by Marco Bellocchio, made 1997
