= Frederick III of Hesse-Homburg =

Landgrave of Hesse-Homburg from 1708 to 1746

Frederick III
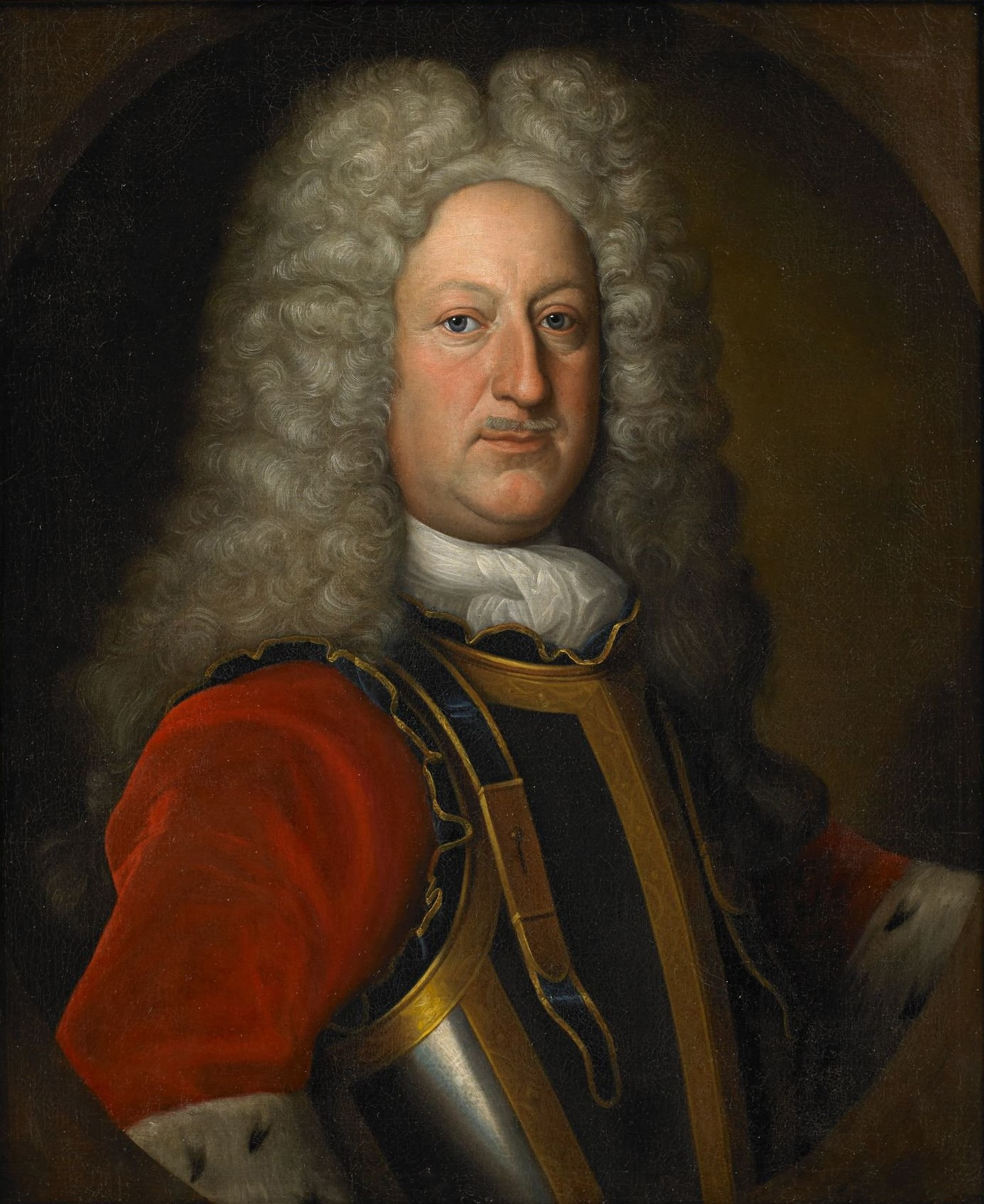
- Portrait, c. 1715–20

Landgrave of Hesse-Homburg
- Reign: 24 January 1708 – 8 June 1746
- Predecessor: Frederick II
- Successor: Frederick IV
- Born: 19 May 1673; Cölln
- Died: 8 June 1746 (aged 73) 's-Hertogenbosch
- Spouse: Elisabeth Dorothea of Hesse-Darmstadt (m. 1700; died 1721) Christiane Charlotte of Nassau-Ottweiler (m. 1728)
- Issue: Ludwig Gruno, Hereditary Prince of Hesse-Homburg
- House: House of Hesse
- Father: Frederick II, Landgrave of Hesse-Homburg
- Mother: Louise Elisabeth of Courland

Frederick III James of Hesse-Homburg (19 May 1673, in Cölln – 8 June 1746, in 's-Hertogenbosch) was a Landgrave of Hesse-Homburg.

== Life ==
Frederick III James was the second son of Landgrave Frederick II of Hesse-Homburg (1633–1708), the famous Prince of Homburg, from his marriage with Louise Elisabeth (1646–1690), daughter of the Duke Jacob of Courland (1610–1662). He received a thorough education in the culturally and spiritually progressive atmosphere of the Electoral Court in Berlin, where his father served as commander of the Brandenburg troops.

After his confirmation in 1687, he joined the Knight academy in Wolfenbüttel. Later, he joined a Cavalry Regiment in Württemberg. In 1690, he was Captain in the Dutch States Army; in 1692, he was Colonel of the Groningen cavalry regiment. He kept being promoted: to Brigadier in 1701, to Major General in 1704 and after Battle of Blenheim on 13 August 1704, to Lieutenant General. He remained in the Dutch service until the Peace of Utrecht, and then took up government in Bad Homburg.

Frederick III could not contribute much to the administration of his territory while he was in Dutch service. Worth mentioning, however, is the foundation in 1721 of the orphanage in Homburg, which still exists as a "Landgraviate Foundation". The archives of the Foundation were transferred to the Bad Homburg city archives in August 2010.

Frederick's tolerant religious policies permitted the publication in Homburg of the book Ein Geistlicher Würtz-Kräuter und Blumen-Garten oder des Universal-Gesang-Buchs ("A religious herbs-and-flower garden, or the universal song-book") by Christoph Schütz.

After the public debt in Hesse-Homburg had grown considerably, Frederick was forced by an imperial debit commission to again take service in The Netherlands in 1738. He was governor of the Belgian city of Liège, then from 1741 governor of Breda. In 1742, he was promoted to General of the Cavalry.

He died in 1746, as governor of 's-Hertogenbosch and was buried in the crypt of Bad Homburg Castle. Since none of his children survived him, he was succeeded as the Landgrave of Hesse-Homburg by Frederick IV, the son of his younger brother Casimir William.

== Marriages and Issue ==
In Butzbach on 14 February 1700, Frederick III married firstly Elisabeth Dorothea of Hesse-Darmstadt (Darmstadt, 24 April 1676 - Homburg, 9 September 1721); she was the daughter of Louis VI, Landgrave of Hesse-Darmstadt. They had ten children:

1. Stillborn daughter (Homburg, 27 November 1700).
2. Fredericka Dorothea Sophia Ernestine (Groningen, 29 September 1701 - Homburg, 11 March 1704).
3. Frederick William Louis (Groningen, 1 November 1702 - Groningen, 19 August 1703).
4. Louise Wilhelmine Eleonore Franziska (Homburg, 2 December 1703 - Homburg, 20 August 1704).
5. Louis John William Gruno, Hereditary Prince of Hesse-Homburg (Homburg, 15 January 1705 - Berlin 13 October 1745), Russian Field Marshal, married on 3 February 1738 to Princess Anastasia Trubezkaya (14 October 1700 - St. Petersburg, 27 November 1755).
6. John Charles William Ernest Louis (Homburg, 24 August 1706 - Fellin, 10 May 1728).
7. Ernestine Louise Dorothea Charlotte (Homburg, 29 January 1707 - Homburg, 19 December 1707).
8. Stillborn son (Homburg, 17 February 1713).
9. Stillborn child (Homburg, 1716?).
10. Frederick Ulrich Louis (Homburg, 2 September 1721 - Homburg, 16 November 1721).

In Saarbrücken on 17 October 1728 Frederick III married secondly Christiane Charlotte of Nassau-Ottweiler (Ottweiler, 2 September 1685 - Homburg, 6 November 1761), widow of Count Charles Louis of Nassau-Saarbrücken. They had no children.

== Ancestry ==
Ancestors of Frederick III of Hesse-Homburg

8. George I, Landgrave of Hesse-Darmstadt
4. Frederick I, Landgrave of Hesse-Homburg
9. Magdalene of Lippe
2. Frederick II, Landgrave of Hesse-Homburg
10. Christopher of Leiningen-Westerburg
5. Margaret Elisabeth of Leiningen-Westerburg
11. Anna Maria Ungnad
1. Frederick III, Landgrave of Hesse-Homburg
12. Wilhelm Kettler, Duke of Courland
6. Jacob Kettler, Duke of Courland
13. Duchess Sophie of Prussia
3. Louise Elisabeth of Courland
14. George William, Elector of Brandenburg
7. Louise Charlotte of Brandenburg
15. Elizabeth Charlotte of the Palatinate

== Notes ==
Frederick III of Hesse-Homburg House of Hesse Born: 19 May 1673 Died: 8 June 1746
Preceded by Frederick II	Landgrave of Hesse-Homburg; 1708–1746	Succeeded by Frederick IV
