= Frederick IV of Hesse-Homburg =

Holy Roman Empire noble (1724–1751)

Frederick IV
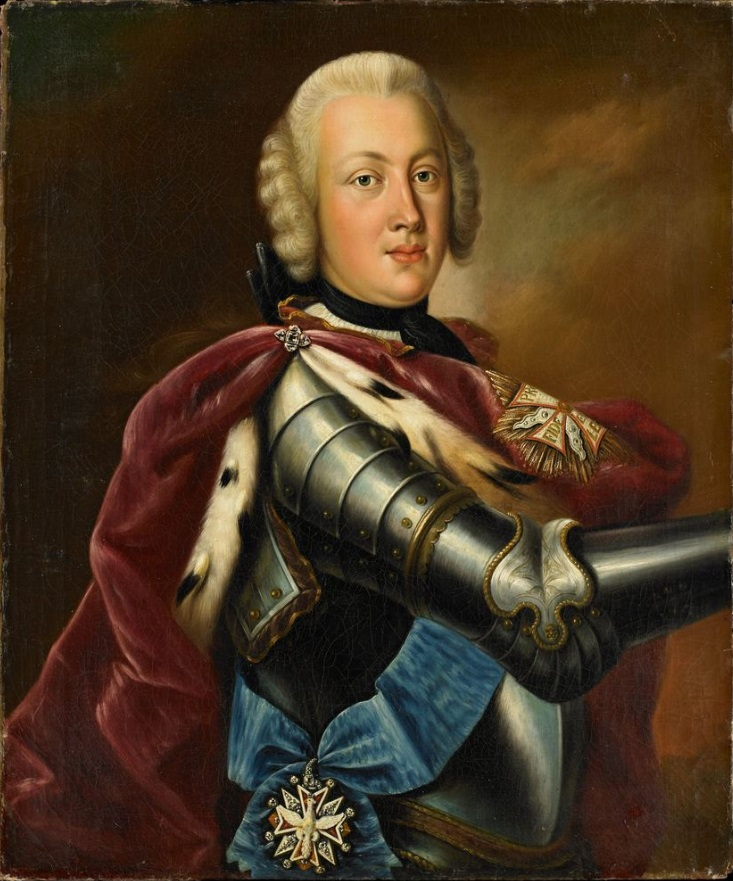
- Portrait, c. 1750

Landgrave of Hesse-Homburg
- Reign: 8 June 1746 – 7 February 1751
- Predecessor: Frederick III
- Successor: Frederick V
- Born: 15 April 1724; Braunfels
- Died: 7 February 1751 (aged 26); Bad Homburg
- Spouse: Ulrike Louise of Solms-Braunfels
- Issue: Frederick V, Landgrave of Hesse-Homburg
- House: House of Hesse
- Father: Casimir William of Hesse-Homburg
- Mother: Christine Charlotte of Solms-Braunfels

Frederick IV Charles Louis William of Hesse-Homburg (15 April 1724 in Braunfels – 7 February 1751 in Bad Homburg), was Landgrave of Hesse-Homburg.

== Life ==
Frederick Charles was born at Castle Braunfels as the first child of Prince Casimir William (1690–1726) and his wife Countess Charlotte Christine (1690–1751), daughter of the Count William Maurice of Solms-Braunfels. His father was a son of Landgrave Frederick II of Hesse-Homburg.

Frederick grew up first at Braunfels Castle, and later in Varel. He was educated in a Humanistic-Christian spirit and attended a few semesters at the University of Leiden. In 1740, he was introduced to Frederick the Great during a visit to Wesel. At the latter's suggestion, he joined the Prussian army in 1741 and participated in the two Silesian wars. He distinguished himself at the siege of Brzeg and was promoted to Captain. In 1744, he participated in the offensive in Bohemia and the siege and conquest of Prague. He fell ill there in 1745, and took a leave of absence.

On 10 October 1746 in Hungen, he married his cousin Ulrike Louise (1731–1792), the daughter of Prince Frederick William of Solms-Braunfels. On 8 June 1746, his uncle, Landgrave Frederick III, died in the Netherlands, without a male heir. Frederick Charles succeeded him in Homburg as Frederick IV.

His prime ministers, Friedrich Karl von Moser and Casimir of Criss tried to resolve the financial problems of Hesse-Homburg Finance rehabilitate, but the mismanagement that led to the formation of an imperial debit commission to oversee the administration of his predecessor, continued.

He had a claim to inherit the Duchy of Courland after the house of Ketteler died out in 1737. Frederick Charles claimed to be entitled to the Duchy via his grandmother Louise Elisabeth of Courland. However, Empress Anna of Russia granted the Duchy to her favourite Ernst Johann von Biron.

In 1747, the senior line of Hesse-Darmstadt tried to regain possession of Homburg. Troops from Darmstadt marched in and Landgrave Louis VIII of Hesse-Darmstadt claimed to be Frederick's legal guardian. Frederick, however, was legally an adult and married. A court case was brought before the Emperor and the Aulic Council. While the case was still being discussed, Frederick IV died in 1751, at the age of 28 of a "chest disease". His son and successor, Frederick V, had celebrated his third birthday a week before.

Frederick IV was buried in the crypt of Bad Homburg Castle.

== Issue ==
From his marriage to Ulrike Louise, Frederick Charles had the following children:

- Frederick V Louis William Christian (Homburg, 30 January 1748 – Homburg, 20 January 1820), Landgrave of Hesse-Homburg.
- Marie Christine Charlotte Wilhelmine (Homburg, 4 November 1749 – Homburg, 10 November 1750).

Frederick IV of Hesse-Homburg House of Hesse Born: 15 April 1724 Died: 7 February 1751
Preceded by Frederick III	Landgrave of Hesse-Homburg; 1746-1751	Succeeded by Frederick V
