= Elisabeth Juliana Francisca of Hesse-Homburg =

German landgravine (1681–1707)

- Fürstin of Nassau-Siegen
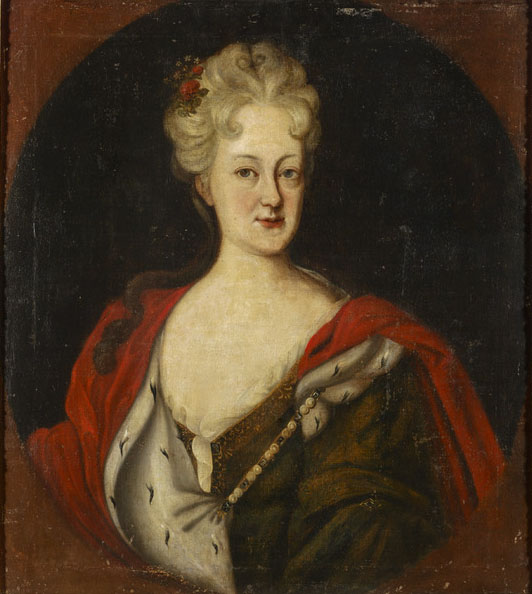
- Anonymous portrait, late 17th century or early 18th century. Middachten Castle, De Steeg.

- Coat of arms
- Full name: Elisabeth Juliana Francisca Landgravine of Hesse-Homburg
- Native name: Elisabeth Juliana Franziska Landgräfin von Hessen-Homburg
- Born: Elisabeth Juliana Franziska Landgräfin zu Hessen, Fürstin zu Hersfeld, Gräfin zu Katzenelnbogen, Diez, Ziegenhain, Nidda, Schaumburg, Isenburg und Büdingen; 6 January 1681; Homburg Castle
- Baptised: 13 January 1681; Siegen
- Died: 12 November 1707 (aged 26); Nassauischer Hof, Siegen
- Buried: 14 November 1707; Fürstengruft, Siegen
- Noble family: House of Hesse-Homburg
- Spouse: Frederick William Adolf of Nassau-Siegen
- Issue Detail: Frederick William II
- Father: Frederick II of Hesse-Homburg
- Mother: Louise Elisabeth of Courland

Landgravine Elisabeth Juliana Francisca of Hesse-Homburg (6 January 1681 – 12 November 1707), German: Elisabeth Juliana Franziska Landgräfin von Hessen-Homburg, official titles: Landgräfin zu Hessen, Fürstin zu Hersfeld, Gräfin zu Katzenelnbogen, Diez, Ziegenhain, Nidda, Schaumburg, Isenburg und Büdingen, was a landgravine from the House of Hesse-Homburg and through marriage Fürstin of Nassau-Siegen.

== Biography ==
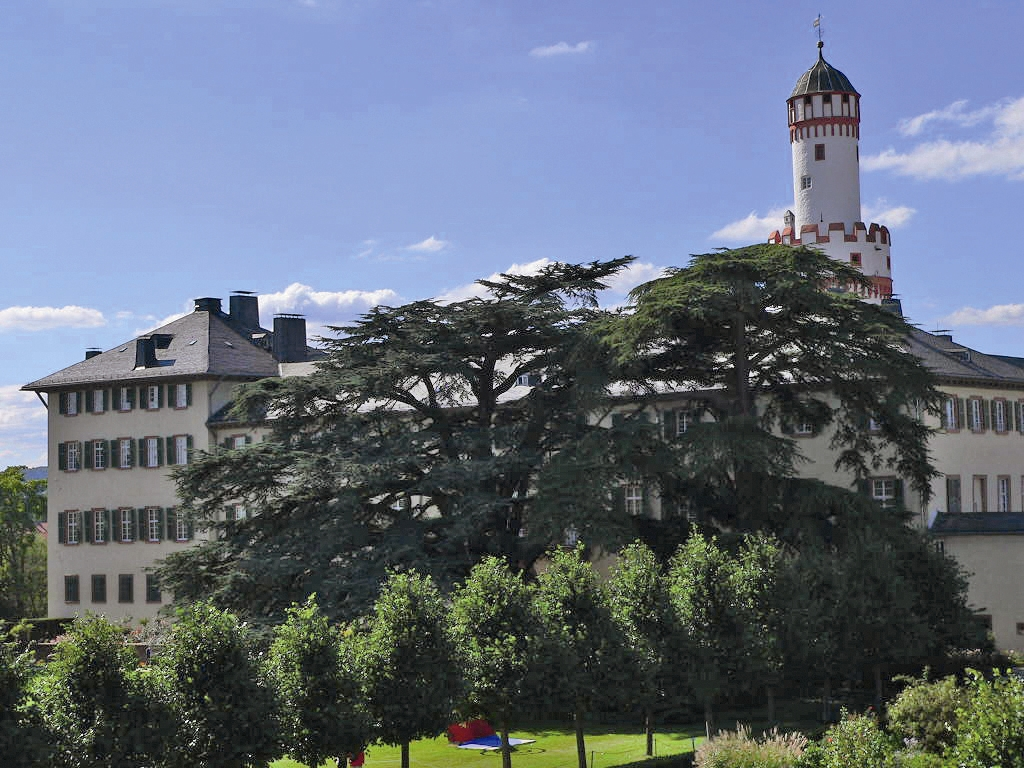
Homburg Castle, 2005.

Elisabeth Juliana Francisca was born at Homburg Castle on 6 January 1681, (Note: "Europäische Stammtafeln I, 117 states, incorrectly, 6‑2‑1681. The actual date is 6‑1‑1681 (see Europäische Stammtafeln I, 106, Knetsch (1931), Dek (1962), Dek (1970) and zu Stolberg-Stolberg & von Arnswaldt), confirmed by the parish records of Homburg, which state that she was born on 6‑1, between eight and nine o'clock in the evening and was baptised on 13‑1.") the fifth daughter of Landgrave Frederick II of Hesse-Homburg and his second wife Duchess Louise Elisabeth of Courland. Elisabeth Juliana Francisca was baptised on 13 January.

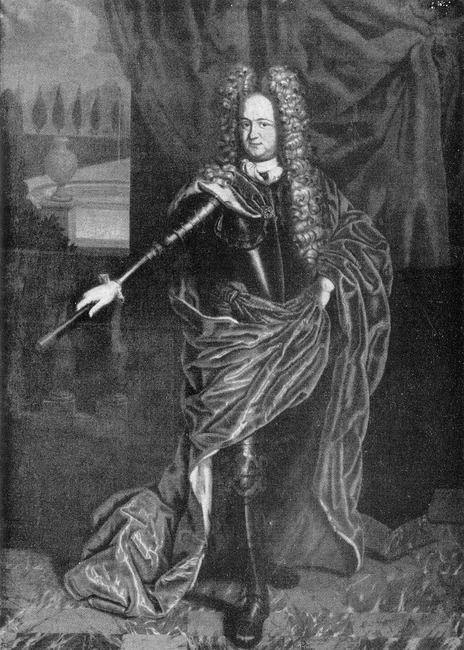
Fürst Frederick William Adolf of Nassau-Siegen, the husband of Elisabeth Juliana Francisca. Anonymous portrait, first quarter 18th century. Siegerlandmuseum, Siegen.

Elisabeth Juliana Francisca married at Homburg Castle on 7 January 1702 (Note: "Although the marriage announcement (State Archives Marburg 4f, Nassau-Siegen, Nr. 241), dated Siegen 12‑1‑1702 says that it was «den 6 hujus mittelst christgewöhnlicher Einsegnung und Beilager vollzogen» (without mentioning the place), we have taken the 7th, just like Knetsch (1931), according to the register of the reformed parish of Homburg: «Ao 1702 den 7 Januarii ist der Durchlachtigste Fürst Friedrich Wilhelm Adolph zu Nassau-Siegen mit der Durchl. Princesse Elisabetha Juliana Francisca Landgräfin zu Hessen Homburg alhier zu Homburg auf dem festen Schloss ehelich vermählet worden». Likewise, the personal details in the printed funeral sermon: «und darauff noch den 7 Januarii zu Homburg in der Hochfürstl. Schloss Kirche nach erfolgter Priestlichen Copulation Dero Hochfürstl. … Beylager gehalten» and the personalia preserved in the Royal House Archive of the Netherlands (IV/1561): «den 7 Januar 1702 zu Homburg a.d.H. vermittelst Priestlicher Copulation». We found 6‑1 in Dek (1962), Europäische Stammtafeln I, 117, Vorsterman van Oyen (1882), and 7‑1 in Europäische Stammtafeln I, 106 and Knetsch (1931)." Menk (2004), p. 199 however mentions the date 6 January 1702.) to Fürst Frederick William Adolf of Nassau-Siegen (Note: "In almost all official documents he is mentioned with these three given names, but sometimes only Frederick William (see for instance Menk (1971), p. 89). Dek (1970) names him Frederik Willem I Adolf; Europäische Stammtafeln on the other hand, mentions him as Adolf in its table Nassau-Siegen (band I, 117), while in other places he mentions him under the double given name Friedrich Wilhelm, which causes some confusion among readers.") (Nassauischer Hof, Siegen, 20 February 1680 – Nassauischer Hof, Siegen, 13 February 1722), the eldest son of Fürst William Maurice of Nassau-Siegen and Princess Ernestine Charlotte of Nassau-Schaumburg. On the death of his father in 1691, Frederick William Adolf succeeded his father as the territorial lord of the Protestant part of the principality of Nassau-Siegen and co-ruler of the city of Siegen. He possessed the district of Siegen (with the exception of seven villages) and the districts of Hilchenbach and Freudenberg. He shared the city of Siegen with the Catholic Fürst of Nassau-Siegen. Frederick William Adolf also succeeded his father as count of Bronkhorst, lord of Wisch, Borculo, Lichtenvoorde and Wildenborch, and hereditary knight banneret of the Duchy of Guelders and the County of Zutphen. Because he was still a minor, he was under the custody and regency of his mother until 1701.

The hospitality of the magistrate of Siegen was always guided by the utmost frugality. When Elisabeth Juliana Francisca's father (who later became known in literature as Prinz Friedrich von Homburg through Heinrich von Kleist) visited the Nassauischer Hof in 1702, he was given the obligatory gift of wine by the city. At an evening reception in the town hall, however, the landgrave had to settle for beer, because – according to the city's accounts – "er seinen Wein bereits erhalten habe" ("he already had received his wine"). As a special honour, however, the magistrate had engaged the city pipers from Cologne for the festive reception, who certainly played at the dinner and the ball.

Elisabeth Juliana Francisca died in the Nassauischer Hof in Siegen on 12 November 1707, 26 years old, five days after the birth of her daughter Sophia Elizabeth. She was buried in the Fürstengruft there on 14 November.

Frederick William Adolf remarried at the Old Castle in Bayreuth on 13 April 1708 (Note: "Although Dek (1962) and Dek (1970) place the marriage in Bayreuth on 20‑4‑1708 (date confirmed by Europäische Stammtafeln I, 117, Europäische Stammtafeln II, 88 and Knetsch (1931)), we find in the marriage contract that was signed in Siegen on 6‑8‑1708: «solches durch das Fürstliche Beylager mit öffentlichen und gewöhnlichen Christfürstlichen Ceremonien den 13. April des noch laufenden 1708 Jahres in der Fürstlichen Residenz zu Bayreuth vollzogen». The date 13 April is confirmed by the notification of the marriage (see State Archives Marburg 4f, Nassau-Siegen N. 241), dated Bayreuth 18‑4‑1708: «den 13. Aprilis allhier zu Bayreuth … durch würklich gehaltenes Beylager». See also in the Royal House Archive of the Netherlands (IV/1561), personalia: «den 13. April 1708 dero christfürstl. Beylager in Bayreuth». The registers of the Hofkirche in Bayreuth have disappeared.") to his first cousin Duchess Amalie Louise of Courland (Mitau, 23 July 1687 (Note: "Although Dek (1970) and Europäische Stammtafeln I, 117 and II, 88 say that she was born on 27‑7‑1687, we could establish that the birth took place in Mitau on the 23rd. Indeed, the notification that the Duke of Courland sent from Mitau on 24‑7‑1687 announces the birth of a daughter «gestern morgens» (see State Archives Wiesbaden 170^{III}).") – Unteres Schloss, Siegen, 18 January 1750), the third daughter of Duke Frederick Casimir of Courland and his first wife Princess Sophie Amalie of Nassau-Siegen. Amalie Louise was not only a first cousin of Frederick William Adolf but also of Elisabeth Juliana Francisca.

In October 1712 Frederick William Adolf and William Hyacinth, the Catholic Fürst of Nassau-Siegen, reached an agreement about their share in the city of Siegen. William Hyacinth ceded the Catholic land to Frederick William Adolf in exchange for an annual pension of 12,000 Reichsthalers. There was even an intention to marry off Maria Anna Josepha, William Hyacinth's underage daughter, to the even younger reformed Hereditary Prince Frederick William, Elisabeth Juliana Francisca's only son. All this was done not in the least to get rid of the troublesome foreign administration. Since April 1707 the Catholic part of the principality of Nassau-Siegen had, by order of the Aulic Council, been under the administration of the cathedral chapter in Cologne, due to the maladministration of William Hyacinth (because the Archbishop of Cologne was in imperial ban at the time, the cathedral chapter governed the Archdiocese of Cologne). Frederick William succeeded his father in 1722 but was under the custody and regency of his stepmother Amalie Louise until 1727.

== Issue ==
From the marriage of Elisabeth Juliana Francisca and Frederick William Adolf the following children were born:

1. Charlotte Frederica (Siegen, 30 November 1702 (Note: "The registers of the Protestant parish of Siegen state that she was born on Thursday afternoon, 30 November at one o'clock and was baptised at the court the following Sunday. So she was born in Siegen. See also State Archives Darmstadt (Hausarchiv 5/74/4), notification of birth dated Siegen 1‑12‑1702: «gestrigen Nachmittags zw. 1 u. 2 Uhren».") – Stadthagen, 22 July 1785 (Note: "See State Archives Bückeburg, Des. L. 176, Stadthagen (ref.) N. 1, S. 92. However, the document does not explicitly mention the place of death. It is also not mentioned in the records of the Lutheran St. Martin's Church in Stadthagen.")), married:
  1. in Weimar on 27 June 1725 to Fürst Leopold of Anhalt-Köthen (Köthen, 29 November 1694^{Jul.} – Köthen, 19 November 1728).
  2. in Varel on 26 April 1730 (Note: "See House Archives Bückeburg, A XIV 7b. The marriage contract mentions the date of the ceremony. See State Archives Wiesbaden (170^{III}), notification dated Varel 27‑4‑1730: «den 26 diesses Monaths durch würkliches Beylaager in der Gräflich Altenburgischen Residentz zu Varel bereits glücklichst vollzogen». See the registers of the Schlossgemeinde (ref.) in Varel: «den 26 April … copuliert». We will therefore neither use the date of 16‑4 given by Europäische Stammtafeln nor the date of 3‑5 (without location) given by Dek (1970).") to Count Albrecht Wolfgang of Schaumburg-Lippe-Bückeburg (Bückeburg, 27 April 1699 – Bückeburg, 24 September 1748).
2. Sophia Mary (Nassauischer Hof, Siegen, 28 January 1704 (Note: "See Dek (1970), confirmed by State Archives Wiesbaden (170^{III}), draft notification dated Siegen 31‑1‑1704: «vergangenen 28. dieses abends zwischen 7 und 8 Uhren».") – Nassauischer Hof, Siegen, 28 August 1704 (Note: "See a) City Archives Siegen, Fürstl. Kanzlei, d.d. Siegen, 1704 August 28: «Nachdem der Leichnam der heutigen Mittag um 11 Uhr … abgelebten … Prinzessin morgen abend in die Fürstliche Gruft beigesetzt werden soll». b) State Archives Wiesbaden (130^{II} 2380^{III} e), notification dated Siegen 29‑8‑1704: «gestrigen Vormittag umb 11 Uhr». The death in Siegen is therefore beyond doubt.")).
3. Sibylle Henriette Eleonore (Note: Huberty, et al. (1981), p. 354 names her Sibylle Henriëtte. The given name Sibylla Henrietta Eleonora in Menk (2004), p. 198; Sibylle Henriëtte Eleonora in Dek (1970), p. 97; Sibylle Henriette Eleonore in Lück & Wunderlich (1956), p. 35 and Sibilla Henrietta Eleonora in Vorsterman van Oyen (1882), p. 128.) (Nassauischer Hof, Siegen, 21 September 1705 (Note: "See Dek (1970), confirmed by State Archives Wiesbaden (170^{III}), draft notification dated Siegen 21‑9‑1705: «heute nachts zwischen 1 u. 2 Uhr». The document contains a note from the chancellery: «Die Hochfürstl. Prinzessin Sibylla Henrietta Eleonora seindt zur Weldt gebohren Montags den 21 7bris 1705 morgens zwischen 1 u. 2 Uhren und darauf dienstags den 29 dito allhier in der Hochfürstl. Residentz vermittelst der Heyl. Taufe».") – Nassauischer Hof, Siegen, 5 September 1712 (Note: "See State Archives Wiesbaden (170^{III}), notification dated Siegen 5‑9‑1712: «heute nachtmittags gegen 4 Uhr». The death therefore occurred in Siegen.")).
4. Fürst Frederick William II (Nassauischer Hof, Siegen, 11 November 1706 (Note: "See Dek (1970), confirmed by State Archives Marburg (4f, Nassau-Siegen, Nr. 241 (2)), notification dated Siegen 11‑11‑1706: «heute früh gleich nach 9 Uhr».") – Nassauischer Hof, Siegen, 2 March 1734 (Note: "Europäische Stammtafeln incorrectly states that he died on 3‑3‑1734. Dek (1970) gives the same date and gives Siegen as place of death. In fact the prince died on 2‑3. See a) parish registers Siegen, b) State Archives Wiesbaden (130^{II} 2209), notification dated Siegen 3‑3‑1734: «gestern nachtmittags zwischen 1 u. 2 Uhr».")), succeeded his father in 1722. Married at Ludwigseck Hunting Lodge near Feudingen on 23 September 1728 (Note: "See the registers of the Protestant court parish in Siegen: «1728 den 23 Sept. Nachts zwischen 11 und 12 Uhr sind auf dem Hochgräfl. Wittgensteinischen Jagdhauses Ludwigs-Eck … ehelich zusammen geworden der Durchl. Fürst und Herr Friedrich Wilhelm …». See State Archives Wiesbaden (170^{III}), notification dated 24‑9‑1728, Wittgenstein: «gestern auf meinem Jagdhaus Ludwigseck durch priesterliche Copulation vollzogen worden».") to Countess Sophie Polyxena Concordia of Sayn-Wittgenstein-Hohenstein (Berlin, 28 May 1709 (Note: "See Archives of the princes of Sayn-Wittgenstein-Hohenstein, Wittgenstein Castle, Laasphe, notification dated Berlin 8‑6‑1709: «am 28ten Maii abends um 9 Uhr». The mother died on 4 June and the child was baptised on 11 June «à la maison» (baptismal register of Berlin Cathedral), which proves that the birth took place in Berlin.") – Untere Schloss, Siegen, 15 December 1781 (Note: "See Dek (1970), confirmed by the parish registers, notifications and an article in the Dillenburgische Intelligenz Nachrichten, LI. Stück, Sonnabends, den 22 Decembris 1781: «Den 15ten dieses des Abends». Vorsterman van Oyen (1882) states she died in 1783.")).
5. Sophia Elizabeth (Nassauischer Hof, Siegen, 7 November 1707 (Note: "It was in Siegen that her mother died a few days after her birth. See Menk (1966). According to the parish registers of Siegen (both for her birth as well as in the death certificate of her mother) the birth is situated on Sunday 6 November at midnight. But we have not chosen this date because of the following two documents: a) Personalia of the mother (printed funeral sermon): «den kurzverwichenen 7 Novemb. eingetretten / Morgends zwischen 1 und 2 Uhr». b) Notification dated Siegen 12‑11‑1707: «am 7. dieses jetzlaufenden Monats morgens zwischen 1 und 2 Uhr».") – Nassauischer Hof, Siegen, 5 October 1708).
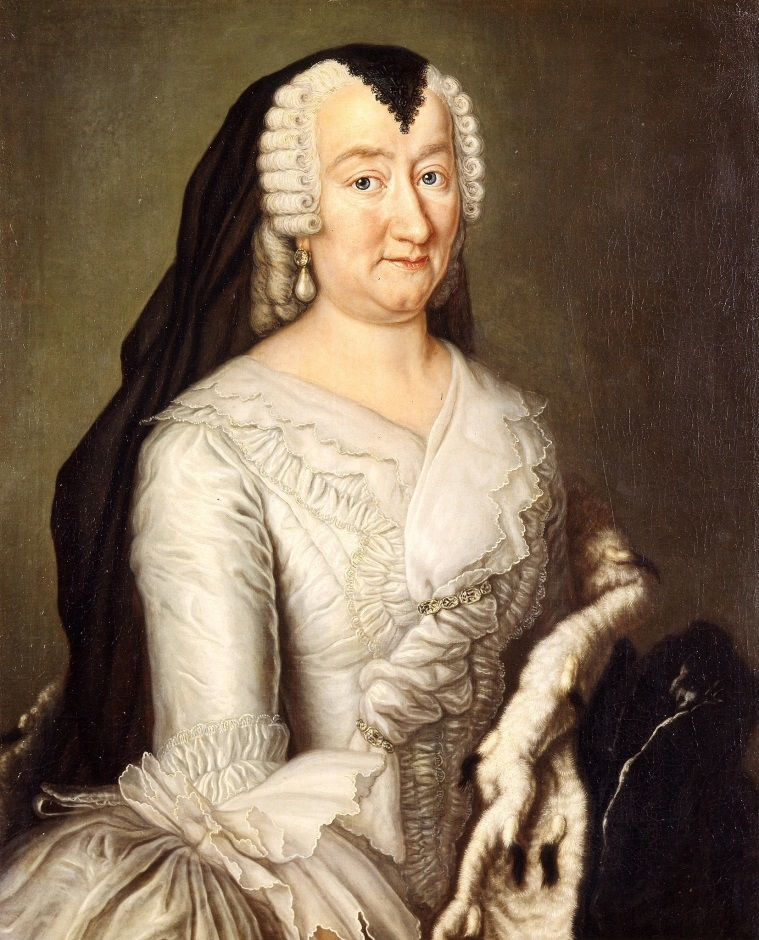
Princess Charlotte Frederica of Nassau-Siegen (1702–1785). Portrait by Christoph Gottfried Ringe, 1751. Foundation Historical Collections of the House of Orange-Nassau, The Hague.

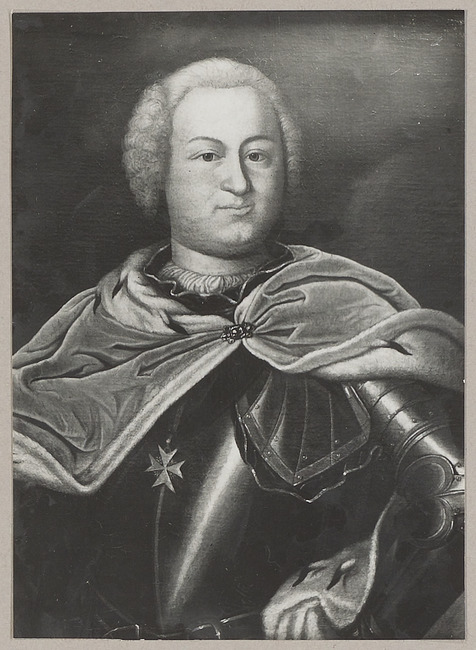
Fürst Frederick William II of Nassau-Siegen. Portrait by Franz Lippold, 1733. Siegerlandmuseum, Siegen.

== Ancestors ==
Ancestors of Elisabeth Juliana Francisca of Hesse-Homburg
Great-great-grandparents	Philip I 'the Magnanimous' of Hesse (1504–1567) ⚭ 1523; Christine of Saxony (1505–1549)	Bernhard VIII of Lippe (1527–1563) ⚭ 1550; Catherine of Waldeck-Eisenberg (1524–1583)	George I of Leiningen-Westerburg (1533–1586) ⚭ 1570; Margaret of Isenburg-Birstein (1542–1612)	Simon Ungnad von Weißenwolff (?–?) ⚭ ? Katharina von Plesse (?–?)	Gotthard of Courland (ca. 1517–1587) ⚭ 1566; Anne of Mecklenburg-Güstrow (1533–1602)	Albert Frederick of Prussia (1553–1618) ⚭ 1573; Marie Eleonore of Jülich (1550–1608)	John Sigismund of Brandenburg (1572–1620) ⚭ 1594; Anne of Prussia (1576–1625)	Frederick IV of the Palatinate (1574–1610) ⚭ 1593; Louise Juliana of Nassau (1576–1644)
Great-grandparents	George I 'the Pious' of Hesse-Darmstadt (1547–1596) ⚭ 1572; Magdalene of Lippe (1552–1587)		Christopher of Leiningen-Westerburg (1575–1635) ⚭ 1601; Anna Maria Ungnad von Weißenwolff (1573–1606)		William of Courland (1574–1640) ⚭ 1609; Sophie of Prussia (1582–1610)		George William of Brandenburg (1595–1640) ⚭ 1616; Elisabeth Charlotte of the Palatinate (1597–1660)	
Grandparents	Frederick I 'the Elder' of Hesse-Homburg (1585–1638) ⚭ 1622; Margaret Elisabeth of Leiningen-Westerburg (1604–1667)				Jacob of Courland (1610–1682) ⚭ 1645; Louise Charlotte of Brandenburg (1617–1676)			
Parents	Frederick II of Hesse-Homburg (1633–1708) ⚭ 1670; Louise Elisabeth of Courland (1646–1690)							

== Sources ==
- Aßmann, Helmut & Menk, Friedhelm (1996). Auf den Spuren von Nassau und Oranien in Siegen (in German). Siegen: Gesellschaft für Stadtmarketing Siegen e.V.
- Behr, Kamill (1854). Genealogie der in Europa regierenden Fürstenhäuser (in German). Leipzig: Verlag von Bernhard Tauchnitz.
- Dek, A.W.E. (1962). Graf Johann der Mittlere von Nassau-Siegen und seine 25 Kinder (in German). Rijswijk: Krips Repro.
- Dek, A.W.E. (1970). Genealogie van het Vorstenhuis Nassau (in Dutch). Zaltbommel: Europese Bibliotheek.
- von Ehrenkrook, Hans Friedrich; Förster, Karl & Marchtaler, Kurt Erhard (1928). Ahnenreihen aus allen deutschen Gauen. Beilage zum Archiv für Sippenforschung und allen verwandten Gebieten (in German). Görlitz: Verlag für Sippenforschung und Wappenkunde C.A. Starke.
- Huberty, Michel; Giraud, Alain & Magdelaine, F. & B. (1976). l'Allemagne Dynastique (in French). Vol. Tome I: Hesse-Reuss-Saxe. Le Perreux: Alain Giraud.
- Huberty, Michel; Giraud, Alain & Magdelaine, F. & B. (1979). l'Allemagne Dynastique (in French). Vol. Tome II: Anhalt-Lippe-Wurtemberg. Le Perreux: Alain Giraud.
- Huberty, Michel; Giraud, Alain & Magdelaine, F. & B. (1981). l'Allemagne Dynastique (in French). Vol. Tome III: Brunswick-Nassau-Schwarzbourg. Le Perreux: Alain Giraud.
- Huberty, Michel; Giraud, Alain & Magdelaine, F. & B. (1994). l'Allemagne Dynastique (in French). Vol. Tome VII: Oldenbourg-Familles alliées H-L. Le Perreux-sur-Marne: Alain Giraud.
- Knetsch, Carl (1931). Das Haus Brabant. Genealogie der Herzoge von Brabant und der Landgrafen von Hessen (in German). Vol. II. Teil: Die Nachkommen Philipps des Grossmütigen. Darmstadt: Historischer Verein für das Großherzogtum Hessen.
- Lück, Alfred (1981) [1967]. Siegerland und Nederland (in German) (2nd ed.). Siegen: Siegerländer Heimatverein e.V.
- Lück, Alfred & Wunderlich, Hermann (1956) [1952]. Die Fürstengruft zu Siegen (in German). Siegen: Verkehrsverein Siegen e.V.
- Menk, Friedhelm (1966). "Die erste Gemahlin von Friedrich Wilhelm Adolf Fürst zu Nassau-Siegen, eine geborene Landgräfin zu Hessen-Homburg". Siegerland (in German). Band XLIII (Heft 3): 94.
- Menk, Friedhelm (1971). Quellen zur Geschichte des Siegerlandes im niederländischen königlichen Hausarchiv (in German). Siegen: Stadt Siegen/Forschungsstelle Siegerland.
- Menk, Friedhelm (2004). "Die Fürstengruft zu Siegen und die darin von 1669 bis 1781 erfolgten Beisetzungen". In Burwitz, Ludwig; Menk, Friedhelm; Opfermann, Ulrich Friedrich; Pfau, Dieter & Plaum, Bernd D. (eds.). Siegener Beiträge. Jahrbuch für regionale Geschichte (in German). Vol. 9. Siegen: Geschichtswerkstatt Siegen – Arbeitskreis für Regionalgeschichte e.V. pp. 183–202. ISSN 1431-6684.
- Spielmann, Christian (1909). Geschichte von Nassau (Land und Haus) von den ältesten Zeiten bis zur Gegenwart (in German). Vol. Teil 1. Politische Geschichten. Wiesbaden: P. Plauen.
- Gräfin zu Stolberg-Stolberg, Sophie Eleonore & von Arnswaldt, Werner Konstantin (1927–1935). Katalog der fürstlich Stolberg-Stolberg'schen Leichenpredigten-Sammlung (in German). Leipzig: Verlag Degener & Co.
- Vorsterman van Oyen, A.A. (1882). Het vorstenhuis Oranje-Nassau. Van de vroegste tijden tot heden (in Dutch). Leiden/Utrecht: A.W. Sijthoff/J.L. Beijers.

Elisabeth Juliana Francisca of Hesse-Homburg House of Hesse-Homburg Born: 6 January 1681 Died: 12 November 1707
Regnal titles
Vacant Title last held by Ernestine Charlotte of Nassau-Schaumburg	Fürstin of Nassau-Siegen (Protestant branch); 7 January 1702 – 12 November 1707	Vacant Title next held by Amalie Louise of Courland
