= Ludwig Gruno, Hereditary Prince of Hesse-Homburg =

Russian field marshal

Ludwig Gruno
- Hereditary Prince of Hesse-Homburg
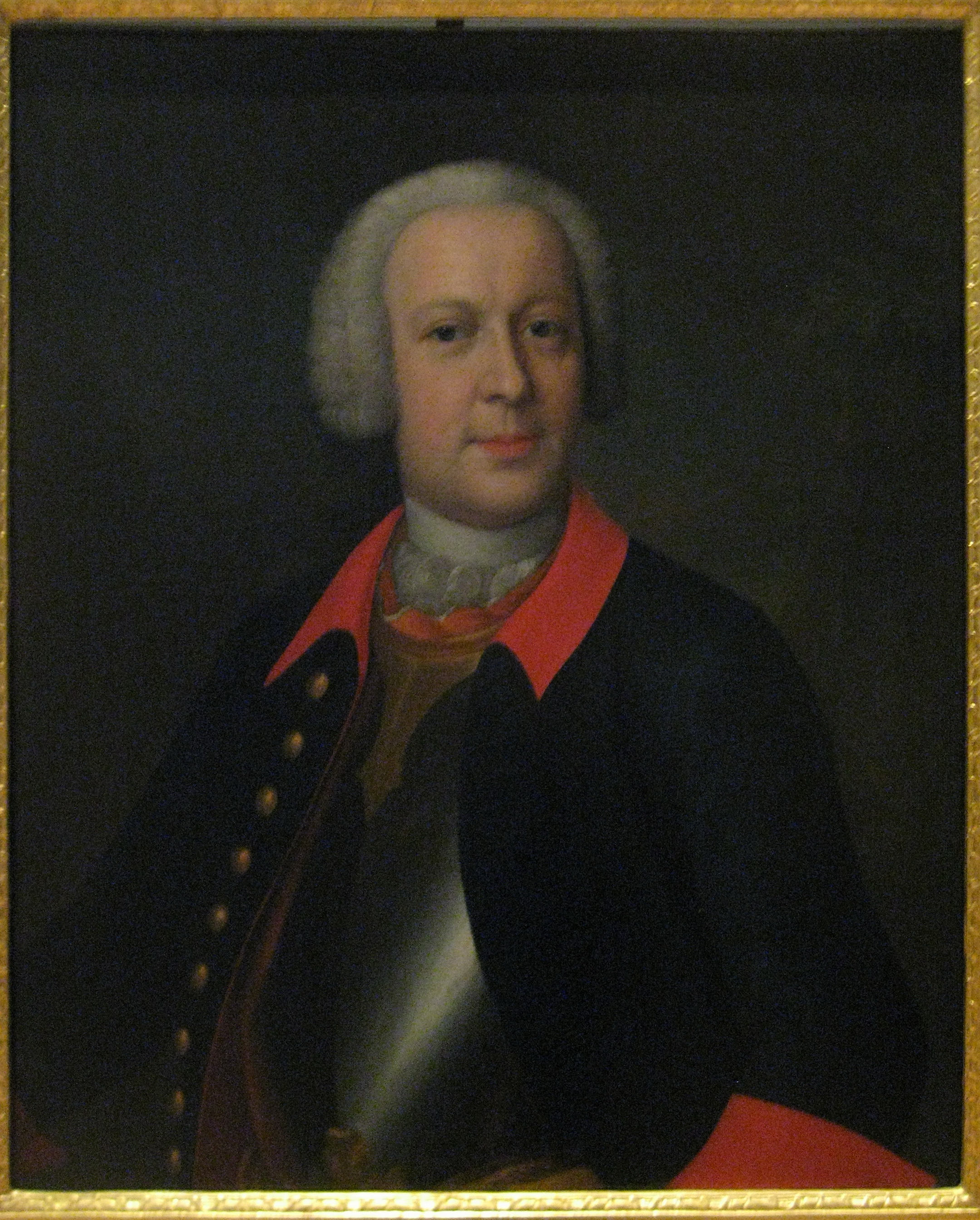
- Ludwig Gruno von Hessen-Homburg in 1741
- Born: 15 January 1705
- Died: 23 October 1745 (aged 40); Berlin
- Burial: Bad Homburg Castle
- Spouse: Anastasiya Trubetskaya
- House: Hesse
- Father: Frederick III, Landgrave of Hesse-Homburg
- Mother: Princess Elisabeth Dorothea of Hesse-Darmstadt

Ludwig Johann Wilhelm Gruno, Hereditary Prince of Hesse-Homburg (15 January 1705 – 23 October 1745) was hereditary prince of Hesse-Homburg, member of the House of Hesse and an Imperial Russian field marshal in the service of Empress Elizabeth of Russia.

== Early life ==
He was the eldest surviving son of Frederick III, Landgrave of Hesse-Homburg and his wife Princess Elisabeth Dorothea of Hesse-Darmstadt (1676–1721), daughter of Louis VI, Landgrave of Hesse-Darmstadt.

== Biography ==
He studied at the University of Giessen and was sent by his father to Russia in 1723. He became Major-General in Riga and commander of the Narva Regiment. As the grandson of Princess Louise Elisabeth of Courland, he hoped in vain to succeed his cousin Ferdinand Kettler as Duke of Courland. Anna of Russia moved him to Saint Petersburg, where he was promoted to General-Lieutenant and commander of the Saint Petersburg garrison.

In 1732, he led a successful campaign against the Crimean Tatars in the Caucasus. After operations in Eastern Poland in 1734–1735, he again fought against the Crimean Tatars and the Turks in 1736–1737, but now under command of Count Burkhard Christoph von Münnich. He was awarded with the rank of General-Feldzeugmeister and was appointed Governor of Astrakhan and the Persian provinces.

Ludwig Gruno also had good relations with the new Empress Elizabeth of Russia. She gave him in 1742 the title of General-Fieldmarshal, a house in Moscow and an estate in Livonia.

He died from illness on a travel in Berlin. He pre-deceased his father and was buried in the crypt of Bad Homburg Castle.

== Family ==
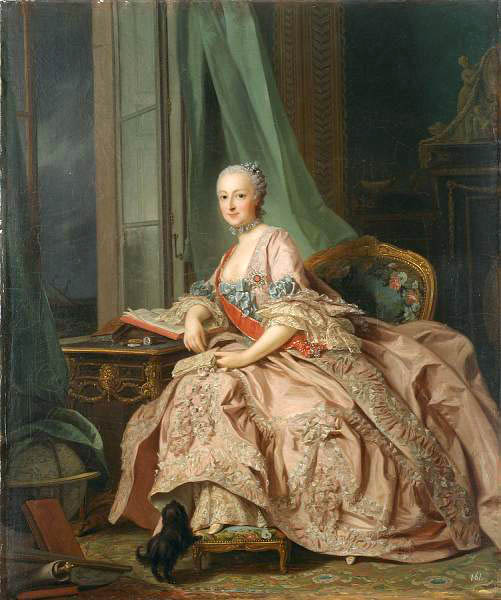
Princess Trubetskaya.

Ludwig Gruno of Hesse-Homburg married Princess Anastasija Trubetskaya, widowed Princess Cantemir, on 3 February 1738.
By birth she was member of House of Trubetskoy as a daughter of Prince Ivan Trubetskoy, cousin of Prince Nikita Trubetskoy. She was widow of Dimitrie Cantemir, Prince of Moldavia.
They had no children.

== Sources ==
- Deutsche Biographie
