= Louis William, Landgrave of Hesse-Homburg =

Louis William
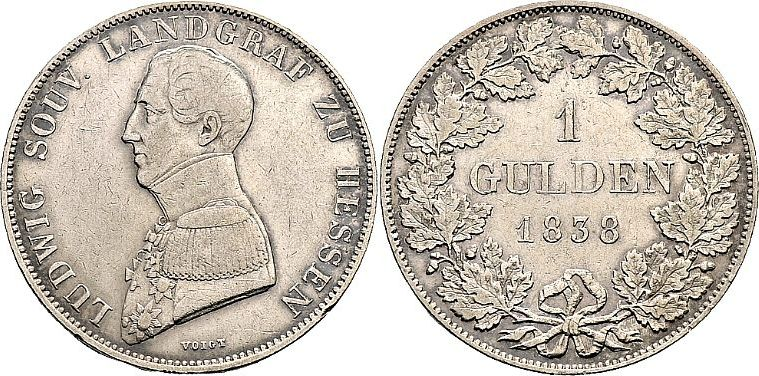
- Gulden coin of Louis William, 1838

Landgrave of Hesse-Homburg
- Reign: 2 April 1829 – 19 January 1839
- Predecessor: Frederick VI
- Successor: Philip
- Born: 29 August 1770; Homburg
- Died: 19 January 1839 (aged 68); Luxembourg
- Burial: Crypt of Bad Homburg Castle
- Spouse: Augusta Amalia of Nassau-Usingen (m. 1804)
- House: Hesse
- Father: Frederick V, Landgrave of Hesse-Homburg
- Mother: Landgravine Caroline of Hesse-Darmstadt

Louis William, Landgrave of Hesse-Homburg (29 August 1770 in Homburg – 19 January 1839 in Luxembourg), was Landgrave of Hesse-Homburg from 1829 until his death.

== Biography ==
Louis was the second son of Landgrave Frederick V and his wife Caroline of Hesse-Darmstadt, a daughter of Landgrave Louis IX of Hesse-Darmstadt and Caroline of Zweibrücken, "the Great Landgravine".

Louis, as he was usually called, was educated together with his elder brother Frederick VI. They studied together in Geneva, and in 1788, they joined the Royal Prussian Army together.

In 1793, he fought in the Battle of Pirmasens. In 1798, he was promoted to major. In 1804, he was promoted to lieutenant colonel, and he married Princess Augusta Amalia of Nassau-Usingen, daughter of Frederick Augustus, Duke of Nassau. This "dynastic marriage" with the daughter of a neighbouring prince was an unhappy one, as she was in love with Count Frederick William of Bismarck. The marriage ended in divorce. Augusta Amalia married Frederick William; Louis William did not marry again. Ricarda Huch gives more details in her Count Mark and the Princes of Nassau-Usingen. A tragic biography of 1925.

In 1806, he fought in the Battle of Jena-Auerstedt and was taken prisoner by the French. After his release, he became major general of the infantry in Königsberg. Here, he reorganized the army in the framework of the Prussian reforms. In 1810, he was transferred to Berlin. In 1813, he fought in the German campaign with his own "Hesse-Homburg Brigade". In the Battle of Leipzig, his troops stormed the Grimma gate and he was injured.

In 1813, he was promoted to lieutenant general and Supreme Commander of the Reserve Corps. During the Hundred Days, he again fought Napoleon's army. After the Second Peace of Paris, he was appointed governor of Luxembourg.

Louis rarely visited Homburg. Hesse-Homburg was administered between 1828 and 1832 by Carl von Ibell. A wealthy man, Louis travelled to many European countries; however, he was always interested in the situation in his own small country. He supported the education reform Ibell was implementing, which provided for a single school system with Protestant, Catholic and Jewish students. The building for a shared school was inaugurated in 1831, and it is now called Landgraf-Ludwig-Schule ("Landgrave Louis School").

He also promoted the creation of a spa in Bad Homburg. He renovated the springs in the town, and added a small spa hall, which today houses a casino.

The district of Meisenheim joined the German Customs Union in 1829; the rest of Hesse-Homburg joined in 1835.

The July Revolution of 1830 sparked unrest in Hesse-Homburg. The army mutinied and several youths from Homburg participated in the Frankfurter Wachensturm.

In 1838, he celebrated the 50th anniversary of his career as a Prussian officer. He paid a two-week visit to Homburg and returned to Luxembourg, where he died on 19 January 1839. He was buried in the crypt of Bad Homburg Castle.

== Ancestry ==
Ancestors of Louis William, Landgrave of Hesse-Homburg

8. Landgrave Casimir William of Hesse-Homburg
4. Frederick IV, Landgrave of Hesse-Homburg
9. Countess Christine Charlotte of Solms-Braunfels
2. Frederick V
10. Friedrich Wilhelm, Prince of Solms-Braunfels
5. Countess Ulrike Louise of Solms-Braunfels
11. Countess Sophie Magdalena Benigna of Solms-Laubach-Utphe
1. Louis William, Landgrave of Hesse-Homburg
12. Louis VIII, Landgrave of Hesse-Darmstadt
6. Louis IX, Landgrave of Hesse-Darmstadt
13. Countess Charlotte of Hanau-Lichtenberg
3. Landgravine Caroline of Hesse-Darmstadt
14. Christian III, Count Palatine of Zweibrücken
7. Countess Palatine Caroline of Zweibrücken
15. Caroline of Nassau-Saarbrücken

Louis William, Landgrave of Hesse-Homburg House of Hesse Born: 29 August 1770 Died: 19 January 1839
Preceded by Frederick VI	Landgrave of Hesse-Homburg; 1829-1839	Succeeded by Philip
