= Louis William =

Louis William may refer to:

- Louis William, Margrave of Baden-Baden (1655–1707)
- Louis William, Landgrave of Hesse-Homburg (1770–1839)
