= Frederick II of Hesse-Homburg =

Frederick II
- Landgrave of Hesse-Homburg
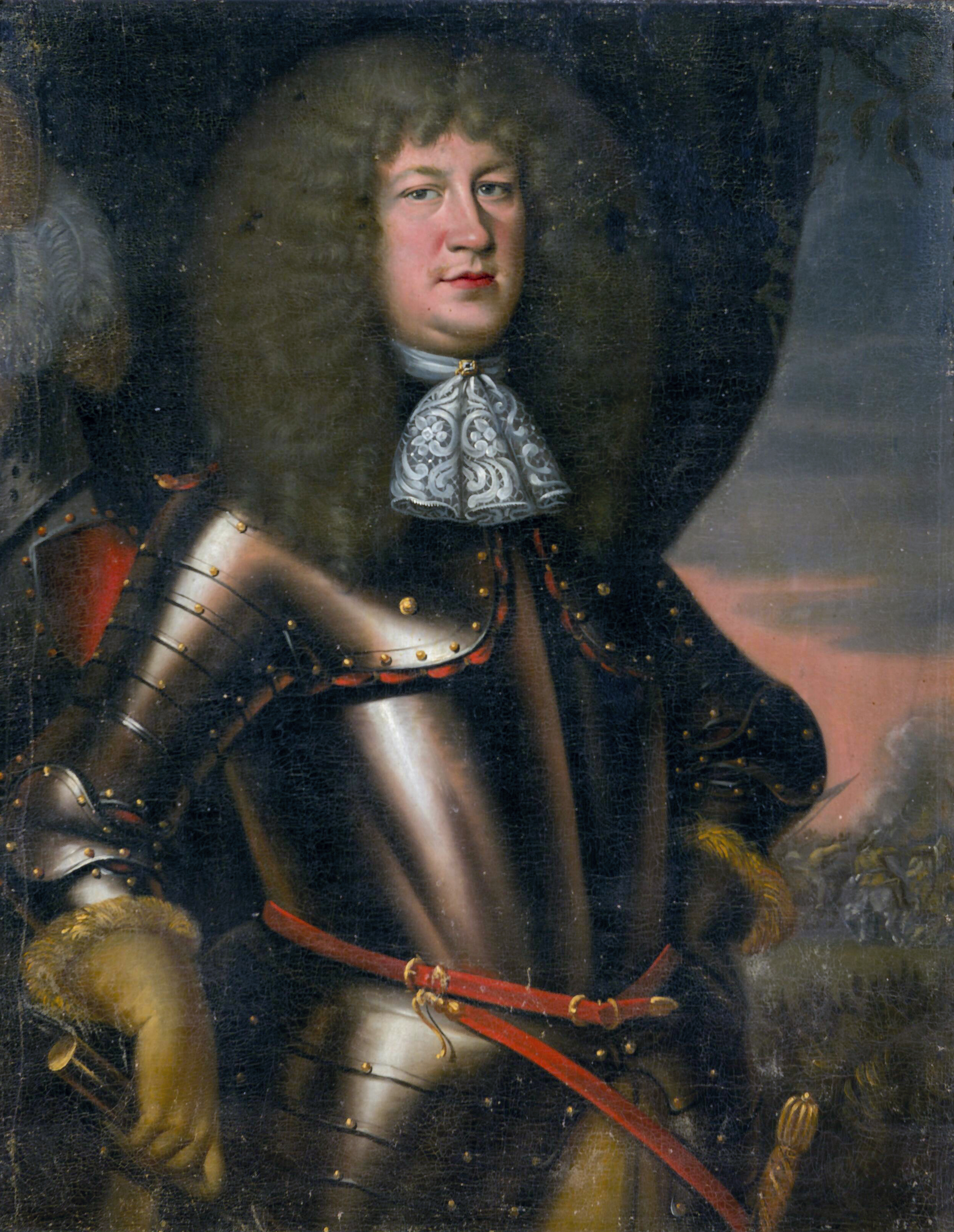
- Portrait by Pieter Nason
- Born: 30 March 1633; Homburg
- Died: 23 January 1708 (aged 74); Homburg
- Spouse: Margarethe Brahe (m. 1661; died 1669) Louise Elisabeth of Courland (m. 1670; died 1690) Sophie Sybille of Leiningen-Westerburg (m. 1691)
- Issue Detail: Charlotte; Frederick III James; Elisabeth Juliana Francisca; Casimir William
- House: Hesse
- Father: Frederick I, Landgrave of Hesse-Homburg
- Mother: Margaret Elisabeth of Leiningen-Westerburg

Frederick II of Hesse-Homburg (German: Friedrich II. von Hessen-Homburg), also known as the Prince of Homburg (30 March 1633 – 24 January 1708) was Landgrave of Hesse-Homburg. He was also a successful and experienced general for the crowns of both Sweden and of Brandenburg, but is best remembered as the eponymous hero of Heinrich von Kleist's play Der Prinz von Homburg.

== Life ==
=== Childhood and youth ===
Frederick was born in Homburg (the present Bad Homburg vor der Höhe), the seventh and youngest child of Landgrave Frederick I of Hesse-Homburg, who died in 1638, leaving the children to be brought up under the care of their mother, Countess Margaret Elisabeth of Leiningen-Westerburg.

At his mother's wish Frederick was educated by private tutors together with the sons of his cousin, George II, Landgrave of Hesse-Darmstadt, in Marburg. In 1648 he broke his leg and spent some time convalescing in Bad Pfäfers.

When Field-Marshal Henri de la Tour d'Auvergne, Vicomte de Turenne, appeared in the vicinity, Frederick was sent by his mother to conduct negotiations for the safety of Homburg. Turenne found the prince so engaging that he wanted to take him straight away into his army and to pay for his military education. Frederick's mother however opposed the idea, and it came to nothing.

At the age of 16 he made the Grand Tour through Italy and France, and was then signed up as a student at the University of Geneva, although he did not follow a real course of academic study: he learned dancing, riding and fencing, and polished his knowledge of the French language.

=== Military career ===
Since his elder brothers preceded him in the succession, he decided on a military career and in 1654 became a colonel in the army of the King of Sweden, Charles X Gustav.

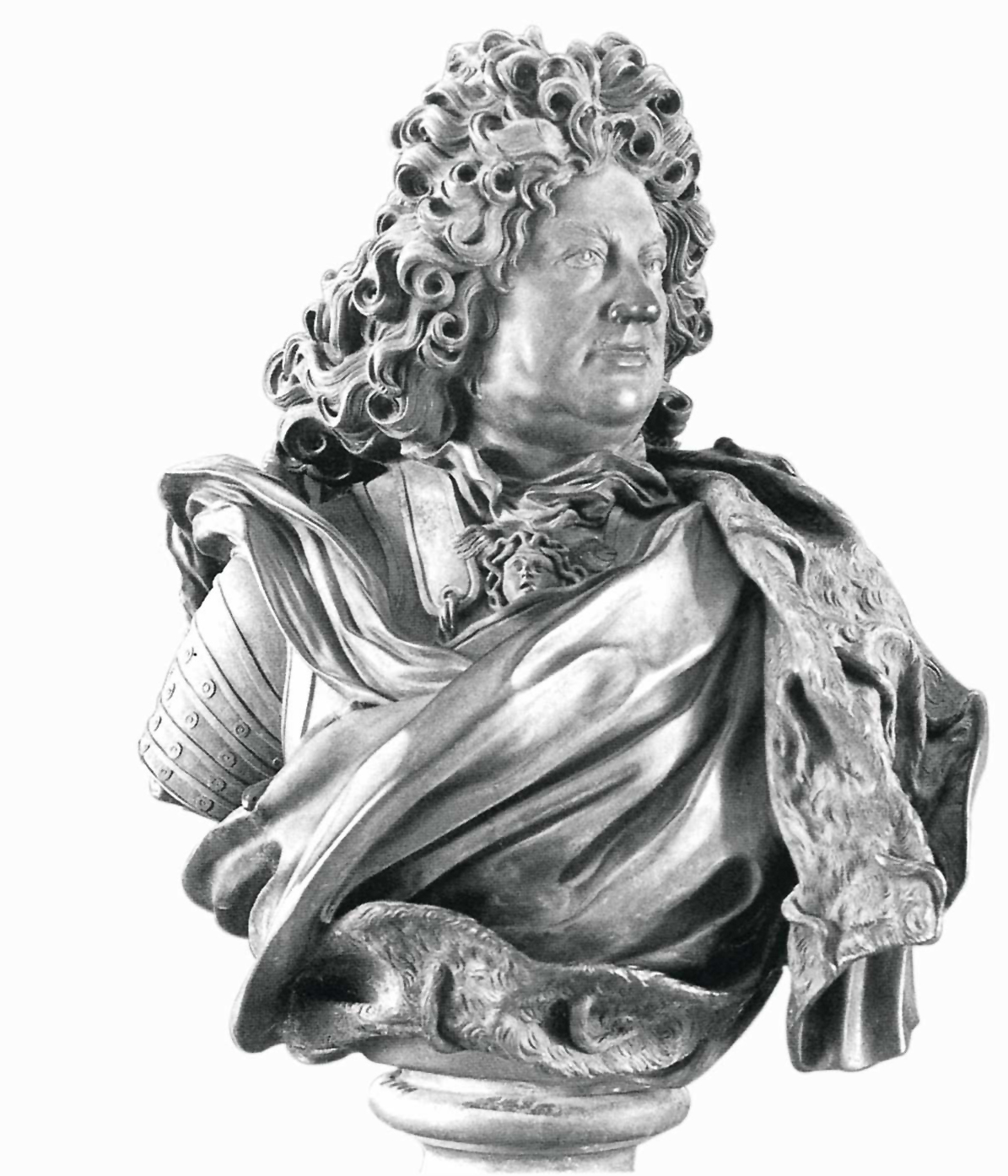
Frederick II of Hesse-Homburg: bust by Andreas Schlüter, cast by Johann Jacobi (vestibule of Schloss Bad Homburg)

In 1659 during the storming of Copenhagen during the Northern Wars Frederick was so seriously wounded that his lower right leg had to be amputated. He was promoted to major-general (Generalmajor) and from then on had a wooden leg. Frederick was chosen by Charles X as the Statthalter of Livonia, but after the king's death things changed considerably, and Frederick left Swedish service in 1661.

In the same year he married Margareta Brahe, a wealthy Swedish widow, who died in 1669. With her wealth he bought estates in Brandenburg and became a friend of the Elector Friedrich Wilhelm I of Brandenburg. In 1670 Frederick married the Elector's niece Princess Luise Elisabeth von Kurland, after moving from the Lutheran to the Reformed church and entering the service of Brandenburg as a general. In 1672 he received the command of all the forces of Brandenburg.

In 1672 and 1674 he fought in the Dutch War, among other places in Alsace against the French army commanded by Turenne. As commander of the Brandenburg cavalry, during the Swedish invasion, on 28 June 1675 in the Battle of Fehrbellin he attacked the Swedish army without orders to do so, causing them heavy losses. In the event this move contributed decisively to the victory of Brandenburg but also to the displeasure of the Elector. In the years 1676-1678 he took part in the campaigns in Pomerania and Prussia and negotiated on behalf of the Elector of Brandenburg the Treaty of Saint-Germain of 1679.

=== Landgrave of Hesse-Homburg ===
After leaving military service he lived as a Junker in Brandenburg. After the death of Georg Christian, his second eldest brother, who had mortgaged to Hesse-Darmstadt the landgraviate of Hesse-Homburg and the town of Homburg, Frederick redeemed them, and took up residence there himself. In 1681, after the death of his brother Landgrave Wilhelm Christoph of Hesse-Homburg, Frederick took over the governance of the territory as Frederick II. He was however forced to return the territory of Bingenheim, which Wilhelm Christoph had occupied, to Hesse-Darmstadt, in exchange for financial compensation.

He had the Baroque Schloss Bad Homburg constructed, and involved himself, with little success, in the local economy with the establishment of a glassworks and a salination plant. More successful was the settlement of Huguenot and Waldensian refugees from France, in Friedrichsdorf and Dornholzhausen. His court alchemist, Paul Andrich, made him a prosthetic leg with springs and silver mounts - whence his nickname "the Landgrave with the silver leg".

In 1690 his wife died, having borne him 12 children. At the age of 59 Frederick married for a third time: the widow Sophie Sybille von Leiningen-Westerburg, a connection of his mother's family, who bore him three more children.

Frederick died in 1708 in Homburg, apparently from pneumonia, after a last journey to Leipzig to meet Charles XII, King of Sweden.

== Marriages and issue ==
Frederick II was married three times: in 1661 to Countess Margarethe Brahe (1603–1669); in 1670 to Princess Louise Elisabeth of Courland (1646–1690); and in 1691 to Countess Sophie Sybille of Leiningen-Westerburg (1656–1724).

Children by Countess Margarethe Brahe (1603–1669): none

Children by Louise Elisabeth of Courland (1646–1690):

- Charlotte Dorothea Sophia (1672–1738)

married 1694 Johann Ernst III, Duke of Saxe-Weimar (1664–1707)

- Frederick III Jacob (1673–1746), Landgrave of Hesse-Homburg

married 1. 1700 Princess Elisabeth Dorothea of Hesse-Darmstadt (1676–1721)
married 2. 1728 Princess Christiane Charlotte of Nassau-Ottweiler (1685–1761)

- Karl Christian (24 March, 1674 – 29 August, 1695), fell at the Siege of Namur Never married or had issue.
- Hedwig Luise (2 March, 1675– 14 March, 1760)

married 1718 Count Adam Friedrich von Schlieben (1677–1752)

- Philipp (24 March, 1676 – 15 November, 1706), fell at the Battle of Speyerbach in the War of the Spanish Succession Never married or had issue.
- Wilhelmine Maria (8 January, 1678 – 25 November, 1770)

married 1711 Count Anton II of Aldenburg (1681–1738)

- Eleonore Margarete (23 September,1679 – 24 November, 1763) Deaness in Reformed Monastery of Herford
- Elisabeth Juliana Francisca (6 January, 1681 –12 November, 1707)

married 1702 Prince Frederick William Adolf, Prince of Nassau-Siegen (1680–1722)

- Johanna Ernestine (28 April, 1682– 10 April, 1698) Died young
- Ferdinand (2 August, 1683 - 5 August, 1683) Died in infancy
- Karl Ferdinand (27 December, 1684 – August 29, 1688) Died young.
- Casimir William (1690–1726)

married 1722 Countess Christine Charlotte of Solms-Braunfels (1690–1751)

Children by Sophie Sybille of Leiningen-Westerburg (1656-1724):

- Ludwig Georg (10 January, 1693– 1 March, 1728)

married 1710 Countess Christine Magdalene of Limpurg-Sontheim (1683–1746) and had one daughter.

- Friederike Sophie (16 December, 1693– 4 April, 1694) Died young
- Leopold (10 April, 1695 - 12 June, 1695) died in infancy

== Literary references ==
Frederick is the eponymous hero of the well-known German drama Prinz Friedrich von Homburg (in full, Prinz Friedrich von Homburg oder die Schlacht bei Fehrbellin) by Heinrich von Kleist (written 1809–1810, first published 1821). The character of the prince in the play however has little apart from the name in common with the historical personage.

The drama in its turn has inspired an opera, Der Prinz von Homburg, by Hans Werner Henze (written 1958, performed 1960) and a number of films, including Marco Bellocchio's Il Principe di Homburg, released in 1997.

== Notes ==
Frederick II of Hesse-Homburg House of Hesse Born: 30 March 1633 Died: 24 January 1708
Preceded by George Christian	Landgrave of Hesse-Homburg; 1680–1708	Succeeded by Frederick III
