= Christiane Charlotte of Nassau-Ottweiler =

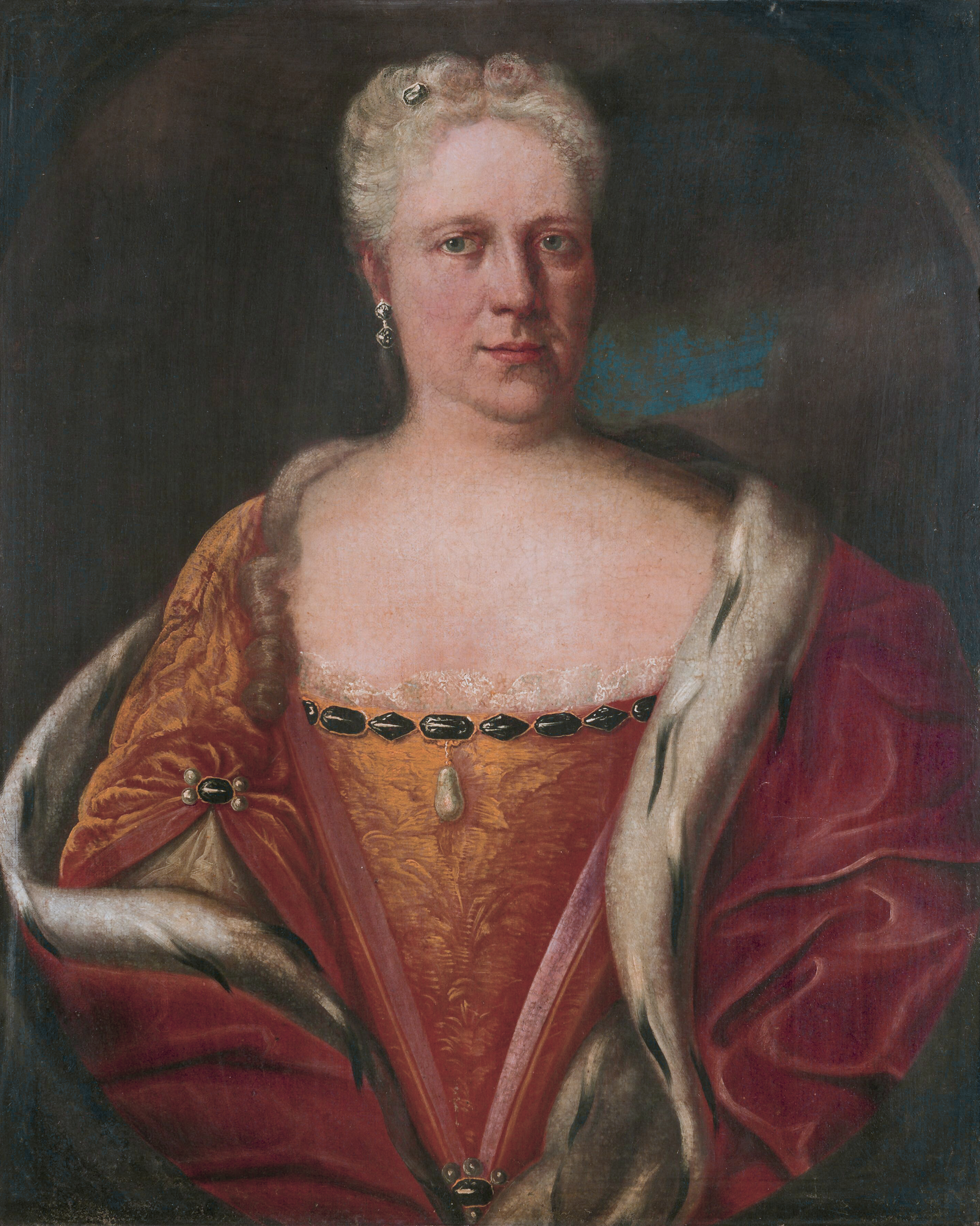
- Christiane Charlotte van Nassau-Ottweiler (1685-1761) (Jacob Hauck, 1729)

Landgravine consort of Hesse-Homburg
- Tenure: 17 October 1728 – 8 June 1746
- Born: 2 September 1685; Ottweiler
- Died: 6 November 1761 (aged 76); Bad Homburg
- Spouse: Charles Louis, Count of Nassau-Saarbrücken (m. 1713; died 1723) Frederick III, Landgrave of Hesse-Homburg (m. 1728; died 1746)
- House: House of Nassau
- Father: Frederick Louis, Count of Nassau-Ottweiler
- Mother: Countess Christiane of Ahlefeldt-Rixingen

Christiane Charlotte of Nassau-Ottweiler (2 September 1685 – 6 November 1761) was a Countess of Nassau-Ottweiler by birth and by marriage successively Countess of Nassau-Saarbrücken and countess of Hesse-Homburg.

== Life ==
Christiane Charlotte was a daughter of the Count Frederick Louis of Nassau-Ottweiler (1651–1728) from his first marriage with Countess Christiane of Ahlefeldt-Rixingen (1659–1695).

She married her first husband, Count Charles Louis of Nassau-Saarbrücken, on 22 April 1713 in Saarbrücken:

She closed her second marriage on 17 October 1728 in Saarbrücken with Landgrave Frederick III of Hesse-Homburg. This marriage came into existence after mediation by Frederick's brother, Landgrave Ernest Louis of Hesse-Darmstadt. This marriage should consolidate the ailing finances of Hesse-Homburg. An imperial debit commission had found only two silver spoons at the court. Frederick III had raised concerns and proposed to inform his bride-to-be, who demanded a proper dower, about his financial situation. Ernest Louis then wrote to Frederick : "Write brother, write, as long as you have time, you can do so."

== Issue ==
From her first marriage, Christiane Charlotte had two sons, who, however, both died in infancy:

- Charles Frederick (1718–1719)
- Louis Charles (1720–1721)
