= Casimir William of Hesse-Homburg =

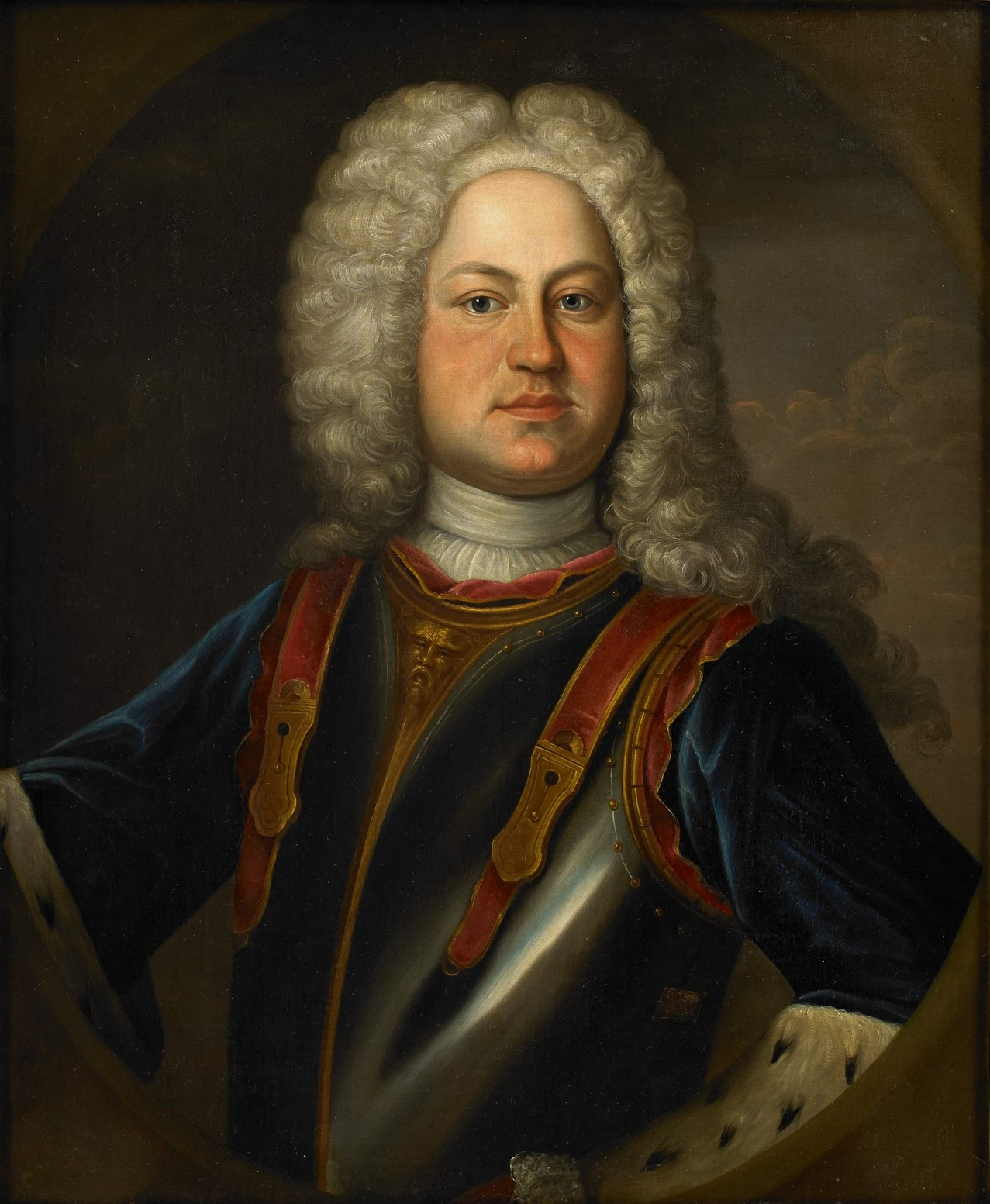
- Portrait, 1724
- Born: 23 March 1690; Weferlingen
- Died: 9 October 1726 (aged 36); Hötensleben
- Spouse: Christine Charlotte of Solms-Braunfels
- Issue: Frederick IV, Landgrave of Hesse-Homburg
- House: House of Hesse
- Father: Frederick II, Landgrave of Hesse-Homburg
- Mother: Louise Elisabeth of Courland

Casimir William of Hesse-Homburg (23 March 1690 in Weferlingen – 9 October 1726 in Hötensleben) was a prince of Hesse-Homburg.

== Life ==
Casimir William was the youngest son of Landgrave Frederick II of Hesse-Homburg (1633–1708), the famous Prince of Homburg, from his second marriage with Louise Elisabeth (1646–1690), the daughter of the Duke Jacob of Courland. He was educated together with his three years younger half-brother George Louis (from Frederick II's his third marriage with Countess Sophie Sybille of Leiningen-Westerburg (1656–1724). During a visit to his cousin Duke Frederick William of Mecklenburg-Schwerin the passion for hunting, which he shared with his father and his brothers, woke up in him.

Since his older brother Frederick III and his two sons preceded him in the line of succession, he opted for a military career and fought in 1708 in a Mecklenburg regiment under Prince Eugene of Savoy. In early 1715, he entered the Swedish army under Charles XII. Already in the early summer he was taken prisoner at Wismar and retired from the military.

In 1718, the princes of Hesse-Homburg divided some properties by drawing lots. Casimir William drew the manor at Hötensleben. He also owned Sinclair House opposite Homburg Castle in Bad Homburg.

His legacy is his hunting diary, which describes his passion for hunting and horses.

== Marriage and issue ==
He married on 9 October 1722 in Braunfels with Charlotte Christine (1690–1751), a daughter of Count William Maurice of Solms-Braunfels. They had three children:

- Frederick IV Charles (1724–1751), ruling Landgrave of Hesse-Homburg

married in 1746 Countess Ulrike Louise of Solms-Braunfels (1731-1792)

- Eugen (1725-1725)
- Ulrike Sophie (1726–1792)
