= Louise Elisabeth of Courland =

Landgravine of Hesse-Homburg from 1670 to 1690

- Landgravine of Hesse-Homburg
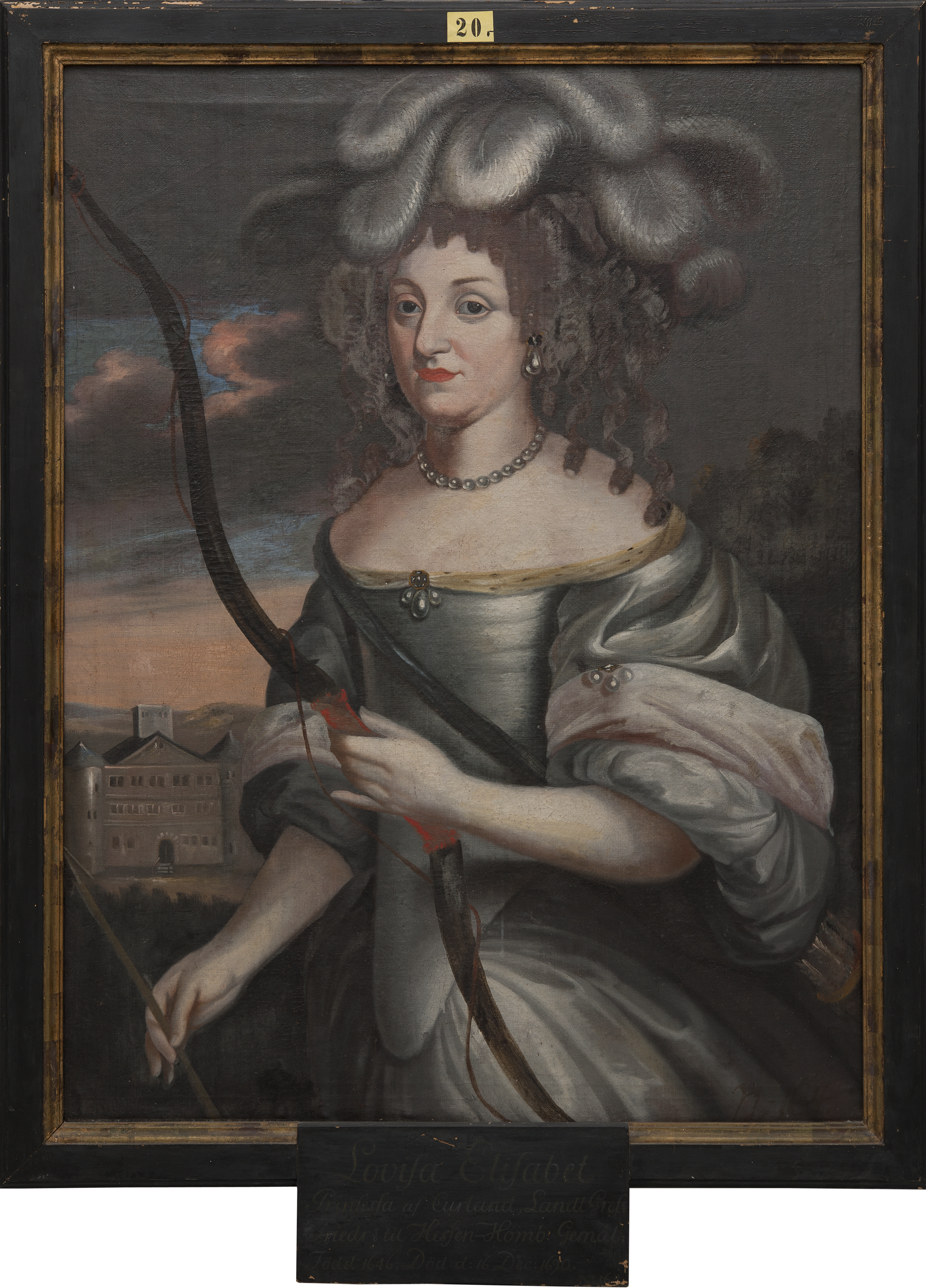
- Portrait from the National Portrait Gallery of Sweden
- Born: 23 August 1646; Jelgava
- Died: 16 December 1690 (aged 44); Weferlingen
- Spouse: Frederick II, Landgrave of Hesse-Homburg (m. 1670)
- Issue Detail: Charlotte; Frederick III James; Elisabeth Juliana Francisca; Casimir William
- House: Ketteler
- Father: Jacob Kettler
- Mother: Louise Charlotte of Brandenburg

Louise Elisabeth of Courland (12 August 1646 in Jelgava – 16 December 1690 in Weferlingen) was Landgravine of Hesse-Homburg by marriage to Frederick II, Landgrave of Hesse-Homburg.

== Life ==
Louise Elisabeth was a daughter of Duke Jacob of Courland (1610-1662) from his marriage to Charlotte Louise (1617-1676), eldest daughter of Elector George William of Brandenburg.

On 23 October 1670 in Cölln, she married the later Landgrave Frederick II of Hesse-Homburg, the famous Prince of Homburg. Frederick had converted to the Calvinist faith for the sake of their marriage. This conversion brought him into closer relations with the princely houses in Brandenburg and Hesse-Kassel, who were also Calvinist. Louise Elisabeth's sister Maria Amalia married Landgrave Charles of Hesse-Kassel in 1673. Louise Elizabeth was a niece of Elector Frederick William of Brandenburg. This relationship allowed Frederick to join the Prussian army and become commander of all the troops of the Electorate only two years later, in 1672.

The Calvinist Louise Elisabeth played a significant role in the settlement of displaced Huguenots and Waldenses in Friedrichsdorf and Dornholzhausen in as well as in the formation of Calvinist congregations in Weferlingen and Bad Homburg.

== Issue ==
- Charlotte Dorothea Sophia (1672–1738)

married 1694 Johann Ernst III, Duke of Saxe-Weimar (1664–1707)

- Frederick III Jacob (1673–1746), Landgrave of Hesse-Homburg

married 1. 1700 Princess Elisabeth Dorothea of Hesse-Darmstadt (1676–1721)
married 2. 1728 Princess Christiane Charlotte of Nassau-Ottweiler (1685–1761)

- Karl Christian (1674–1695), fell at the Siege of Namur
- Hedwig Luise (1675–1760)

married 1718 Count Adam Friedrich von Schlieben (1677–1752)

- Philipp (1676–1706), fell at the Battle of Speyerbach in the War of the Spanish Succession
- Wilhelmine Maria (1678–1770)

married 1711 Count Anton II of Aldenburg (1681–1738)

- Eleonore Margarete (1679–1763)
- Elisabeth Juliana Francisca (1681–1707)

married 1702 Prince Frederick William Adolf, Prince of Nassau-Siegen (1680–1722)

- Johanna Ernestine (1682–1698)
- Ferdinand (born and died 1683)
- Karl Ferdinand (1684–1688)
- Casimir William (1690–1726)
