= Der Prinz von Homburg (opera) =

1960 opera by Hans Werner Henze

- Opera by Hans Werner Henze
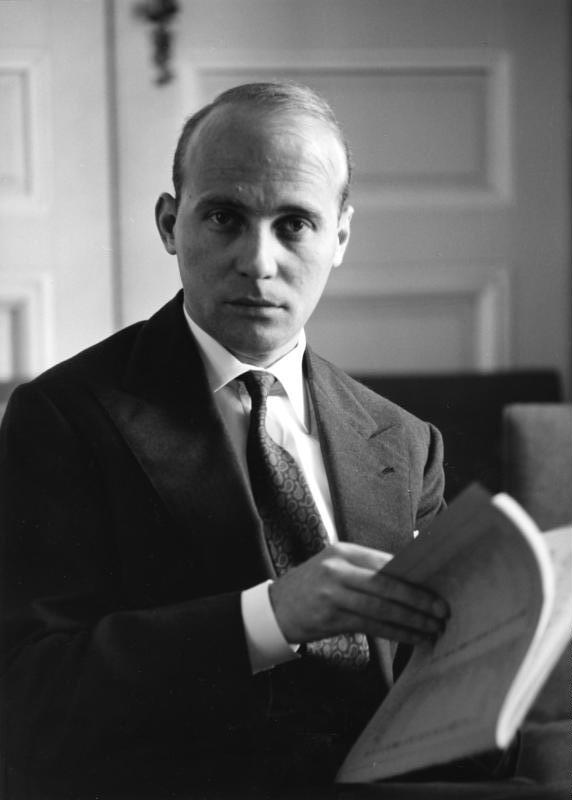
- The composer in 1960
- Librettist: Ingeborg Bachmann
- Language: German
- Based on: Prinz Friedrich von Homburg by Heinrich von Kleist
- Premiere: 22 May 1960; Hamburg State Opera

Der Prinz von Homburg (The Prince of Homburg) is a German-language opera in three acts by Hans Werner Henze with a libretto by Ingeborg Bachmann (1926–1973). It was completed in 1958 but premiered on 22 May 1960 in Hamburg.

== Background ==
The text is based on the 1811 play, Prinz Friedrich von Homburg by Heinrich von Kleist. Frederick Bridgham prepared an English-language translation for the English National Opera/Schott 1996 production in London. The opera shows Henze's strong personal dislike of German militarism.

In a 1996 lecture, extracted and translated in the programme to the ENO 1996 production, Henze mentions the Leipzig tradition from Bach to Max Reger, Hermann Grabner and Wolfgang Fortner, the Viennese classical tradition and the Second Viennese School, in particular Beethoven and Arnold Schoenberg, Gustav Mahler and Stravinsky as influences. He describes how he contrasts "the beautiful old harmonies of yesterday" used to represent the Prince's dreamworld with "serially organized military music, with a predominance of fanfare-like fourths and fifths in the twelve-note row" used for the waking world.

== Performance and recording history ==
There have been at least two multi-national productions of the opera. The premiere production was toured to London in 1962.

A revised production by Nikolaus Lehnhoff was first seen in the Cuvilliés Theatre, Munich. A DVD of this production, recorded in Munich in 1994 by the Bavarian State Opera, has been released with Wolfgang Sawallisch conducting and with a cast including François le Roux in the title role, MariAnne Häggander as Natalie and William Cochran and Helga Dernesch as the Elector and Electress.

Elgar Howarth won a 1997 Laurence Olivier Award for conducting ENO's Die Soldaten / The Prince of Homburg at the London Coliseum.

== Roles ==
Roles, voice types, premiere cast
| Role | Voice type | Premiere cast, 22 May 1960 (Conductor: Leopold Ludwig) |
|---|---|---|
| Friedrich Wilhelm, Elector of Brandenburg | heldentenor | Helmuth Melchert |
| The Electress, his wife | contralto | Mimi Aarden |
| Princess Natalie of Orange, her niece | soprano | Liselotte Fölser |
| Field Marshal Dörfling | baritone | Vladimir Ruzdjak |
| Friedrich Artur, Prince of Homburg | high baritone | Toni Blankenheim |
| Colonel Obrist Kottwitz, in the Prince's regiment | bass | Herbert Fliether |
| Count Hohenzollern, attached to the Elector | lyric tenor | Heinz Hoppe |
| Three officers | tenor, baritone, bass | |
| Three ladies-in-waiting | soprano, mezzo-soprano, contralto | |
| Sergeant | baritone | Hermann Prey |
| Two orderlies | tenor, baritone | |

== Synopsis ==
The opera is set in Fehrbellin in Brandenburg during the Prusso-Swedish Wars in the seventeenth century, immediately around the Swedish defeat at the battle of Fehrbellin in 1675

Prince Friedrich and Princess Natalie are in love, and she is promised to him by the Elector. Field Marshal Dörfling outlines the plan of battle, but the Prince day-dreams about the princess. During the battle, not having listened to the orders he was given, he attacks prematurely, endangering the outcome by sending his cavalry after retreating Swedes. Nevertheless, the attack is successful. The Elector orders the arrest of the disobedient officer. The Prince is imprisoned, and the Elector is expected to ratify the sentence of death. The Prince appeals through Princess Natalie, but she is told that the Prince must agree with the legitimacy of the sentence. Natalie uses her Dragoons to free the Prince. Meanwhile, the Elector, knowing that he has taught the Prince his lesson, decides to pardon him. Blindfolded, the Prince is led towards his execution, but when the blindfold is removed, the Elector gives him the hand of the Princess.
