= Charles Louis, Count of Nassau-Saarbrücken =

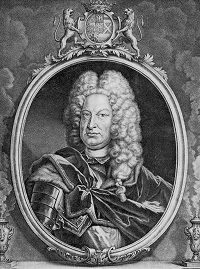
- Born: 6 January 1665; Saarbrücken
- Died: 6 December 1723 (aged 58); Idstein
- Noble family: House of Nassau
- Spouse: Christiane Charlotte of Nassau-Ottweiler (m. 1713)
- Father: Gustav Adolph, Count of Nassau-Saarbrücken
- Mother: Countess Clara Eleanor of Hohenlohe-Neuenstein

Charles Louis, Count of Nassau-Saarbrücken (6 January 1665 – 6 December 1723) was the son of Count Gustav Adolf of Nassau-Saarbrücken and Countess Clara Eleanor of Hohenlohe-Neuenstein.

He was born in Saarbrücken, but was brought up by Wolfgang Julius of Hohenlohe-Neuenstein the brother of his mother, and continued his studies in Tübingen and Paris. In the Great Turkish War, he served as an officer in the army of Emperor Leopold I.

When his brother Louis Crato died in 1713 he took up the government in Nassau-Saarbrücken. That same year he married Christiane Charlotte of Nassau-Ottweiler, the daughter of his cousin Frederick Louis of Nassau-Ottweiler.

During his reign, he promoted the industrialization of his country. In Warndt he expanded the glass works, which had been established already under Louis II by settling Huguenot refugees. In Sulzbach, he built a new salt works in 1719 and a graduation tower. He founded the town of Karlings (now: Carling), which was named after him.

When his second cousin, Count George August Samuel of Nassau-Idstein, died in 1721, he took up government in Nassau-Idstein-Wiesbaden, jointly with his cousin Frederick Louis of Nassau-Ottweiler. He moved briefly to Wiesbaden in 1722, but returned to Saarbrücken later that year, then moved to Idstein in 1723. He died there on 21 December 1723 and was buried in the chapel of Idstein. A plaque in the castle church in Saarbrücken refers to him.

As both his sons died in infancy, the government of Nassau-Saarbrücken was inherited by father-in-law Frederick Louis of Nassau-Ottweiler.

== Marriage and issue ==
Charles Louis married Christiane Charlotte of Nassau-Ottweiler, the daughter of his cousin Frederick Louis of Nassau-Ottweiler. They had two sons:

- Charles Frederick (1718–1719)
- Charles Louis (1720–1721)

== References and sources ==
- Ernst Joachim (1882). "Karl Ludwig von Nassau-Saarbrücken" . Allgemeine Deutsche Biographie (in German). Vol. 15. Leipzig: Duncker & Humblot. pp. 311–312.
- Albert Ruppersberg: Geschichte der Grafschaft Saarbrücken, vol. 2, Saarbrücken, 2nd ed., 1910 (reprinted: St. Ingbert, 1979), pp. 195–203

Charles Louis, Count of Nassau-Saarbrücken House of Nassau Born: 6 January 1665 Died: 6 December 1723
Preceded by Louis Crato	Count of Nassau-Saarbrücken; 1713–1723	Succeeded by Frederick Louis as Count of Nassau-Ottweiler
Preceded by George August	Count of Nassau-Idstein; 1721–1723	Succeeded by Frederick Louis as Count of Nassau-Ottweiler
