= The Prince of Homburg (film) =

1997 Italian drama film

- Film poster
- Directed by: Marco Bellocchio
- Written by: Marco Bellocchio; Heinrich von Kleist
- Produced by: Pier Giorgio Bellocchio
- Starring: Andrea Di Stefano; Barbora Bobuľová; Toni Bertorelli
- Cinematography: Giuseppe Lanci
- Edited by: Francesca Calvelli
- Music by: Carlo Crivelli
- Release date: 8 May 1997
- Running time: 85 minutes
- Country: Italy
- Language: Italian

The Prince of Homburg (Italian: Il principe di Homburg) is a 1997 Italian drama film directed by Marco Bellocchio, based on the play Der Prinz von Homburg by Heinrich von Kleist. It was entered into the 1997 Cannes Film Festival.

== Cast ==
- Andrea Di Stefano as Prince of Homburg
- Barbora Bobuľová as Natalia
- Toni Bertorelli as Elector
- Anita Laurenzi as Electoress
- Fabio Camilli as Hohenzollern
- Gianluigi Fogacci
- Italo Dall'Orto
- Bruno Corazzari as Kottwitz
- Diego Ribon
- Pierfrancesco Favino as Sparren
- Federico Scribani as Capt. Stranz (as Federico Scribani Rossi)

== See also ==
- List of historical drama films
