= The Prince of Homburg (play) =

1810 play by Heinrich von Kleist

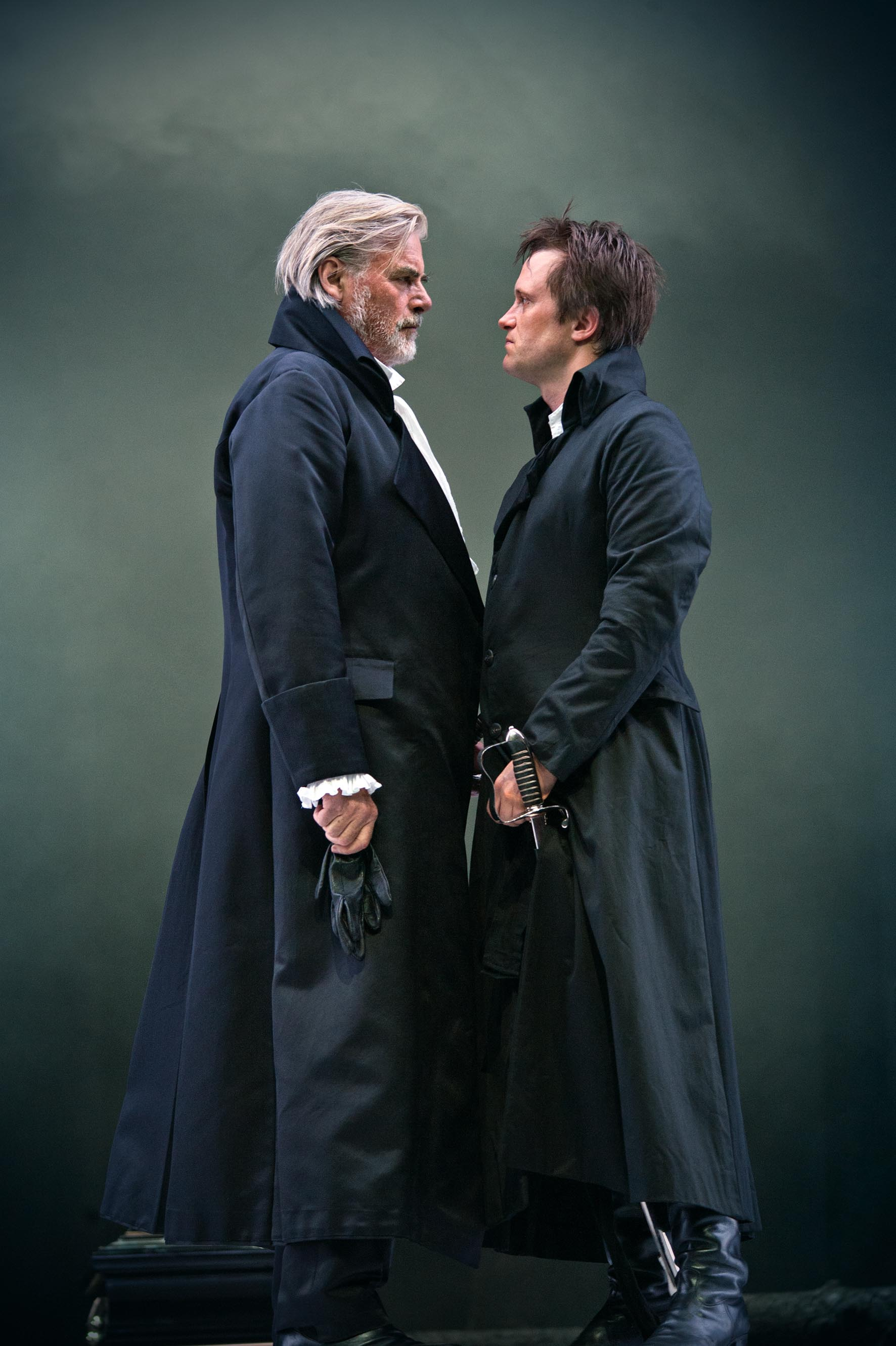
Peter Simonischek as Kurfürst and August Diehl as Homburg, Salzburg Festival 2012

The Prince of Homburg (German: Der Prinz von Homburg, Prinz Friedrich von Homburg, or in full Prinz Friedrich von Homburg oder die Schlacht bei Fehrbellin) is a play by Heinrich von Kleist written in 1809–10, but not performed until 1821, after the author's death.

The title relates to the real Prince of Homburg at the Battle of Fehrbellin in 1675, Friedrich von Hessen-Homburg (1633–1708), but beyond the name and place there is little if any resemblance between the Romantic character in the play and the eponymous Friedrich, a successful professional soldier of many years' standing.

The play has been filmed a number of times, and inspired the opera Der Prinz von Homburg by Hans Werner Henze (premiere 1960).

== Plot ==
Action takes place at Fehrbellin and in Berlin, 1675. The Prince of Homburg, a young officer of the Great Elector (Frederick William I, Elector of Brandenburg), is exhausted after a long campaign. Walking in his sleep, he puts on a laurel wreath. Several noblemen notice this, and the Great Elector plays a trick on the Prince, which leads him to declare his love for the Elector's niece, Natalie. He is able to take one of her gloves. After waking from his dream the Prince is puzzled by the glove in his hand. When at the next council of war the plans for the next battle are being discussed, and duties are being handed out, the Prince is thrown into confusion by the appearance of Princess Natalie, who reveals herself as the owner of the glove, and he is distracted to the extent that he fails to take on board his orders, which are not to engage the enemy without a direct order to do so. Contrary to his instructions he attacks the enemy at the Battle of Fehrbellin – and wins.

The Elector however is concerned above all with discipline. Regardless of the victory, he has the Prince arrested for disobeying an order and tried at a court martial, where the Prince is condemned to death. He fails initially to grasp the seriousness of the situation, and starts to be truly concerned only when he hears that the Elector has signed his death warrant. The reality of his situation only hits home when he is shown the grave that has been dug for him. In the famous and controversial "fear of death scene" (Todesfurchtszene) the Prince begs for his life, prepared to give up all that is dear to him in return. When the Elector hears of the Prince's reaction, he too is confused, possibly astonished, but claims to have the greatest respect for the Prince's feeling. Instead of simply pardoning him, however, he sets a condition: if the Prince can genuinely call his condemnation unjust, he will be pardoned. The question raises the Prince to a state of enlightenment: he conquers his fear of death and is prepared to "glorify" the sentence by a suicide. It remains debatable whether he really considers his sentence justified. Nor does it ever come to light to what extent the Elector may have planned all this to teach him a lesson.

Meanwhile, Natalie, without a legitimate order, has recalled Kottwitz's regiment to obtain support for Homburg's pardon. In the face of the general pressure now put on him, the Elector now listens to his officers. Kottwitz is of the opinion that what counts on the field of battle is victory, and that there is nothing with which to reproach the Prince. Hohenzollern goes further and attributes the guilt to the Elector, as he caused the Prince's confusion and consequent insubordination by the trick he played on him, and therefore bears the responsibility himself. Finally the Elector asks the officers if they are happy to continue to trust themselves to the Prince's leadership – to which all say yes.

The Prince learns nothing of his pardon, but is led blindfolded into the open air, in the belief that he is about to be executed. But there is no bullet: instead, the niece of the Elector crowns him with a laurel wreath. To his question whether this is a dream, Kottwitz replies, "A dream, what else" ("Ein Traum, was sonst"). The Prince faints.

== Characters ==
- Friedrich Wilhelm, Kurfürst von Brandenburg
- The Kurfürstin
- Prinzessin Natalie von Oranien, his niece
- Feldmarschall Dörfling
- Prinz Friedrich Arthur von Homburg, general of the cavalry
- Obrist Kottwitz, colonel of the dragoon regiment of the Prinzessin von Oranien
- Hennings, infantry colonel
- Graf Truchß, infantry colonel
- Graf Hohenzollern, of the Elector's entourage
- Rittmeister von der Golz and others

== Historical background ==
In his Mémoires pour servir à l'histoire de la maison de Brandenbourg, Frederick the Great describes how Prince Friedrich of Hessen-Homburg in the Battle of Fehrbellin engaged in a self-willed and precipitate attack on the enemy – and won the battle. This seems to be an anecdote unfounded in historical fact, but Kleist made use of it as a source anyway and developed the subject matter freely. Particularly, Kleist changed the prince's action "without express orders" into action " against express orders".

At the time when Kleist was writing the play, there were a number of topical instances of insubordination which could have provided the inspiration behind it:

The weakness and passivity of the Prussian King Friedrich Wilhelm III towards Napoleon's constant expansion of his power, was a great problem for many of his subjects and contemporaries. In the face of the threat presented by the French to the country's very existence a wave of Prussian patriotism arose, to which Kleist himself was not immune.

The young Prince Louis Ferdinand of Prussia attacked the enemy without authorisation in 1806 in the Battle of Saalfeld. His attack was unsuccessful, and resulted in a defeat; the prince himself died in the battle. Nevertheless, many people praised his courage and his personal engagement for the fatherland, and he became posthumously a popular national hero.

In 1809 under the command of Major Ferdinand von Schill many unsanctioned military actions against the French oppressors were carried out by the Prussian Freikorps. Schill found many followers and supporters among those who felt betrayed by the king's negligible resistance.

== Reception ==
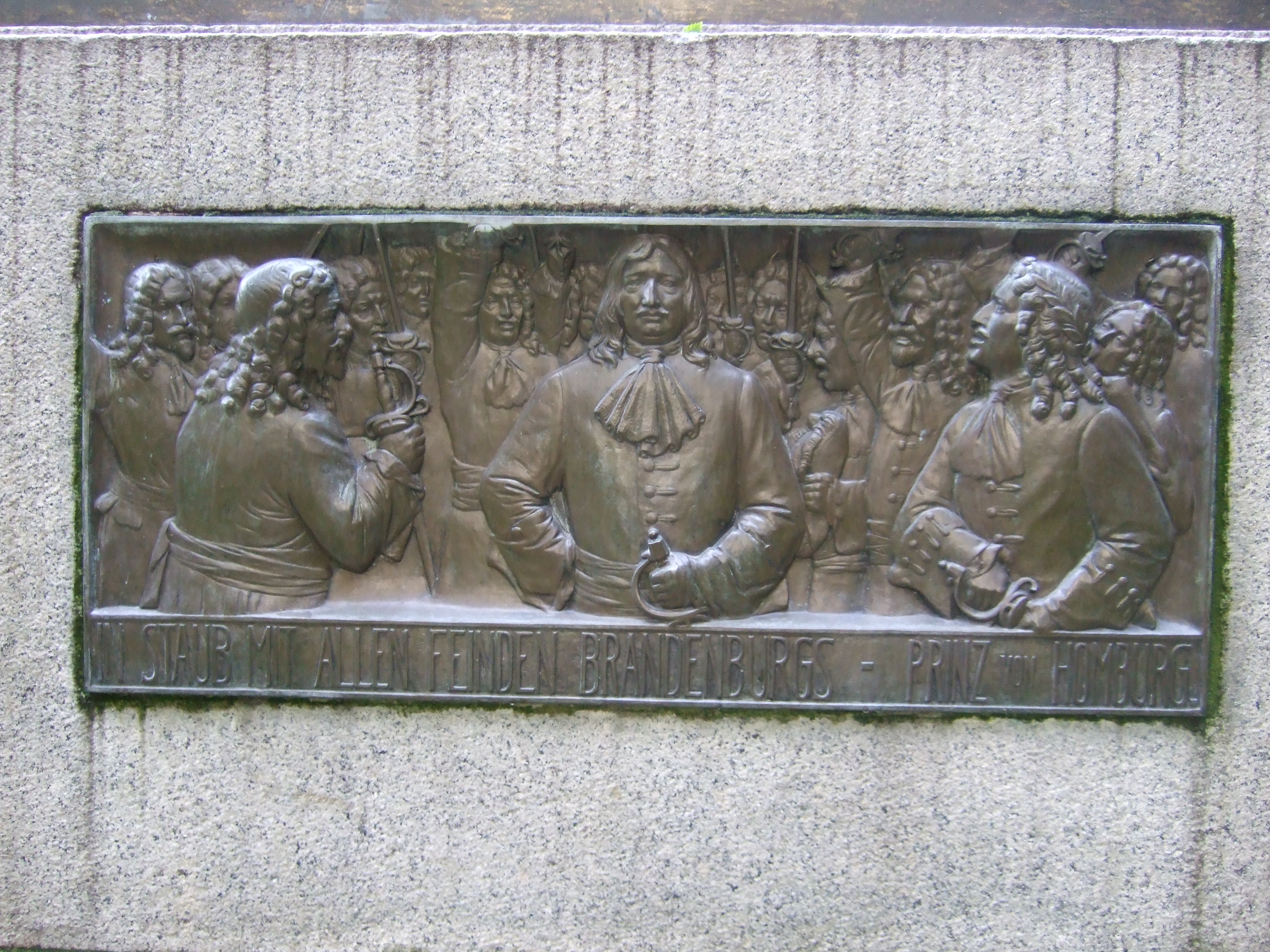
Relief showing the Prince of Homburg on the Heinrich von Kleist monument of 1910 in Frankfurt an der Oder

The play was not published or produced during Kleist's lifetime. The author dedicated his work to Princess Marianne of Hesse-Homburg, the protagonist's great granddaughter and wife of Prince William of Prussia. The princess felt her family honour insulted by the play and blocked its productions. In a shortened version under the title Die Schlacht von Fehrbellin it had its premiere in Vienna in 1821, but after only four performances was taken off when Archduke Karl objected to it. In 1828 it was performed for the first time in Berlin, again in a shortened form, but after three performances the King banned it.

This, Kleist's last play, met with resistance not only from his contemporaries. The fear of death scene was long held to be unperformable and was always omitted. Equally criticised were the prince's sleep-walking and the trick played by the Elector. This was because although these were things that were acceptable in comedy, they offended the rules governing the portrayed behaviour of the aristocratic figures of tragedy. This was a convention that really only disappeared shortly before the First World War, when it did become possible to portray an aristocrat as a figure of comedy, for example Baron Ochs in Hugo von Hofmannsthal's Der Rosenkavalier.

Heinrich Heine praised the work as "as though written by the genius of poetry itself". For de la Motte Fouqué it was "the most divine poem ever to proceed from the pen of Kleist". Friedrich Hebbel however commented that through the representation of the fear of death, an enlightenment of the protagonist was achieved that in other works could only be produced by death itself. Otto von Bismarck simply thought that the prince was a "weak reed – with his fear of death".

It was a very popular piece however during the Third Reich, generally with a number of significant amendments to tailor it to contemporary circumstances. This resulted in its almost total neglect in the period after World War II and it returned only slowly to the German stage.

== Translations ==
- Hermann Hagedorn: in The German Classics of the Nineteenth and Twentieth Centuries, Vol. IV, edited by Kuno Francke (1914)
- Noel Clark: in Three Plays (Oberon Books, 2000)
- David Constantine: in Kleist: Selected Writings (Hackett Publishing, 2004)

== Adaptations ==
=== Stage translations ===
The play's popularity outside Germany may be traced to the famous 1951 Avignon production by Jean Vilar, with Gérard Philipe as the prince and Jeanne Moreau as Natalie. Incidental music for the production was commissioned from Maurice Jarre (his first score). The following year, the play was revived by Philipe and Jean Le Poulain at the Théâtre des Champs-Élysées. This version does not follow Kleist's original in some particulars. In the final scene, when a blindfold is removed, the prince finds himself in a church about to be married with Natalie.

In 1976 the play was chosen to open the theatre in the Royal Exchange in Manchester. It was translated by Jonathan Griffin and directed by Caspar Wrede with Tom Courtney in the title role.

Also in 1976, the play received its professional American premiere, at the Brooklyn Academy of Music in a Chelsea Theater Center production starring Frank Langella. The production was filmed for WNET's Theater in America series.

In 2002, Neil Bartlett adapted and directed a co-production of the play performed in the Swan Theatre of the Royal Shakespeare Company's and at the Lyric Theatre Hammersmith. The Elector was played by James Laurenson, the Prince by Dan Fredenburgh and Count Heinrich by Will Keen.

In 2009, Marie-José Malis toured, with a French-language version created with the help of Alain Badiou, explicitly asking audience members in a session held prior to the staging whether there were any other possibility than the death of the Prince, and making discussion on the topic part of the experience of the play. The day before the staging in Arles, on May 14, 2009, she held a public discussion in the theatre, asking the public whether they had any suggestions as to how the play should end, as she herself was still undecided as to how to end the play. This fostering of discussion was itself an important element of the re-staging of the play. In the event, on that first night in Arles at least, the Prince and Natalia and a soldier friendly to their cause shoot their way out of the place in which the Prince is to be executed.

The Prince of Homburg, an English stage adaptation by Dennis Kelly, was premiered at the Donmar Warehouse from 22 July to 4 September 2010, with the Elector played by Ian McDiarmid. This adaptation altered the ending so that the Prince met with the Elector to accept the death sentence and to ask as his last wish that the Elector continue the war with Sweden rather than make peace. The Elector honours this dying wish of the Prince, though once the Prince has gone he tells his generals that he will only continue it three days and then make peace after all – he feels that the Prince almost lost him victory once by his impetuosity and will not lose it again at the Prince's request. Natalia scatters flowers where the Prince is to be shot, which he finds just before he is then shot, alone. The Elector then makes a speech exhorting his people to continue the war, but meets with hostile silence. This change of ending was criticised by drama critics, including Michael Billington of The Guardian

In the Soviet Union, Kleist's play was disparaged as a "celebration of the Prussian military". A Russian translation of The Prince of Homburg was completed by Boris Pasternak in 1919 but was not approved for publication until the Molotov–Ribbentrop Pact.

=== Other media ===
Hans Werner Henze based on it his opera Der Prinz von Homburg, in three acts, first performed in Hamburg in 1960. It has also been filmed a number of times for cinema and television, most recently in two Italian versions: Il principe di Homburg, directed by Gabriele Lavia (1983) and Il principe di Homburg, directed by Marco Bellocchio (1997).

== Sources ==
- Garland, H and M, 2000: The Oxford Companion to German Literature. OUP
