= Debit commission =

A debit commission (German: Debitkommissionen) (from the Latin debere "to owe") was in the Holy Roman Empire a means to resolve the problems of over-indebted states. These states were usually, but not always, immediate Imperial States.

== Imperial commissions ==
The Aulic Council was entitled to delegate its authority to an "imperial commission". Such a commission could be tasked to deal with all subject matter for which the Aulic Council itself was responsible. In about three quarters of all cases, the Council did this at the request of one of the parties in a case before the Council. To what extent the Council used commissions has not yet been exhaustively researched. This is partly due to the fact that Council would often delegate organizational matters to an imperial commission, such as regulating an inheritance of guardianship. Only a small subset of the imperial commissions were used to resolve legal disputes. During the reign of Emperor Ferdinand III, 650 such commissions were documented. In over 70 cases, the Council rejected a request to create an imperial commission.

The commission would be established by an imperial patent, based on a decision by the Aulic Council. Formally, the commission would act on behalf of the Emperor.

A commission would consist of one or more members. Usually they would be selected on the basis of geographical proximity to the parties, and would be members of the same Imperial Circle. In the early days, meticulous attention was paid to the religious affiliation of the commissioners.

Parties could object to the creation of a commission or the selection of its members, if, for example, they were perceive to be biased. The Aulic Council would rule on such objections. A few states (for example, the imperial city of Regensburg) had a privilege granted by Emperor Charles V, exempting them from the commissions system.

=== Competencies ===
Various different tasks could be assigned to an imperial commissions. Some commissions were only tasked with an inquiry; others were charged with the implementation of various measures.

If a legel decision had to be made, the Aulic Council would usually make it, although sometimes the council would appoint a "deciding judge" or a "deciding commission", who were authorized to make legal decisions. The imperial commission would usually try to find a compromise solution to resolve the conflict, and secure this compromise in a treaty between the parties.

In extreme cases, the Emperor would permit the use of military force to support an imperial commission.

=== Topics ===
Some 80% of the plaintiffs and 90% of the defendants were immediate subjects of the Emperor. Cases dealt with by commissions spanned the full range of topics causing conflicts in the era. About one third of cases were family problems, mostly inheritance disputes. Another third were economic issues, and about 15% of cases were about sovereignty.

A common issue was debt regulation and overindebtedness. Commissions dealing with debts were called debit commissions (Latin: Commissiones ad tractandum cum creditoribus).

== Debit commissions ==
Johann Jakob Moser distinguishes three types of debit commissions depending on the order ideal types into three types.

- Commissions of inquiry: tasked to determine the actual financial situation
- Commissions of administration: tasked to carry out specific order specific measures to service debt
- Bankruptcy commissions: tasked to carry out the formal bankruptcy procedure

=== Reasons for the indebtedness of the States ===
The reasons for states to be overindebted varies. Sometimes the cause was a war; sometimes a sovereign prince spent too much money to maintain a magnificent court; sometimes the cause was excessive military spending. Especially at the end of the Thirty Years' War, many sovereign princes were burdened with a heavy war debt: they had spent heavily during the war, and their revenues had dwindled.

In later times, the more usual cause of payment was spending too much on the operation of the princely court.

=== Remit of the debit commissions ===
Debit commissions were given their remit in writing. These letters were very often using the exact some wording. The commissions were tasked to

- Take control of the debtors civil servants, i.e. have them swear allegiance to the commission and take control over their hierarchy
- Create a list of assets and liabilities
- Agree an amicable payment plan with the creditors
- Undertake measures to improve the debtor's ability to pay
- Write a judgement and publish it

=== Priority of the debit commission ===
Debtors often requested the creation of the debit commission. One reason for this is that a debit commission was a "universal forum" in which all claims against this debtor would be considered. The commission could set aside judgements passed against the debtor in other courts. All existing debts became responsibilities of the debit commission, who would treat all creditors equitably and fairly.

=== Bankruptcy proceedings ===
In bankruptcy proceedings, the Commission could arrange security measures and appoint a property manager. In the first phase of a bankruptcy, there was a public call for creditors to file their claims. The claims were verified and, if found valid, declared "liquid", i.e. legitimate and enforceable. In the next phase, the claims were prioritized and available funds were divided among the creditors accordingly.

== Legal basis ==
Imperial debit commissions were regulated by the Aulic Regulations.

The Reichskammergericht had competencies overlapping those of the Aulic Council and also had the ability to set up commissions. However, the Reichskammergericht was not authorized to deal with bankruptcy cases.

When the Holy Roman Empire was dissolved in 1806, the legal basis for the imperial debit commissions ceased to exist. However, in many cases, the commissions renamed themselves from "imperial debit commission" to simply "debit commission" and continued their work. For example, the commission set up in 1769 to deal with Saxe-Hildburghausen, was active until 1826.
