= Bad Homburg Castle =

Castle in Hesse, Germany

Coordinates: 50.2279°N 8.6100°E

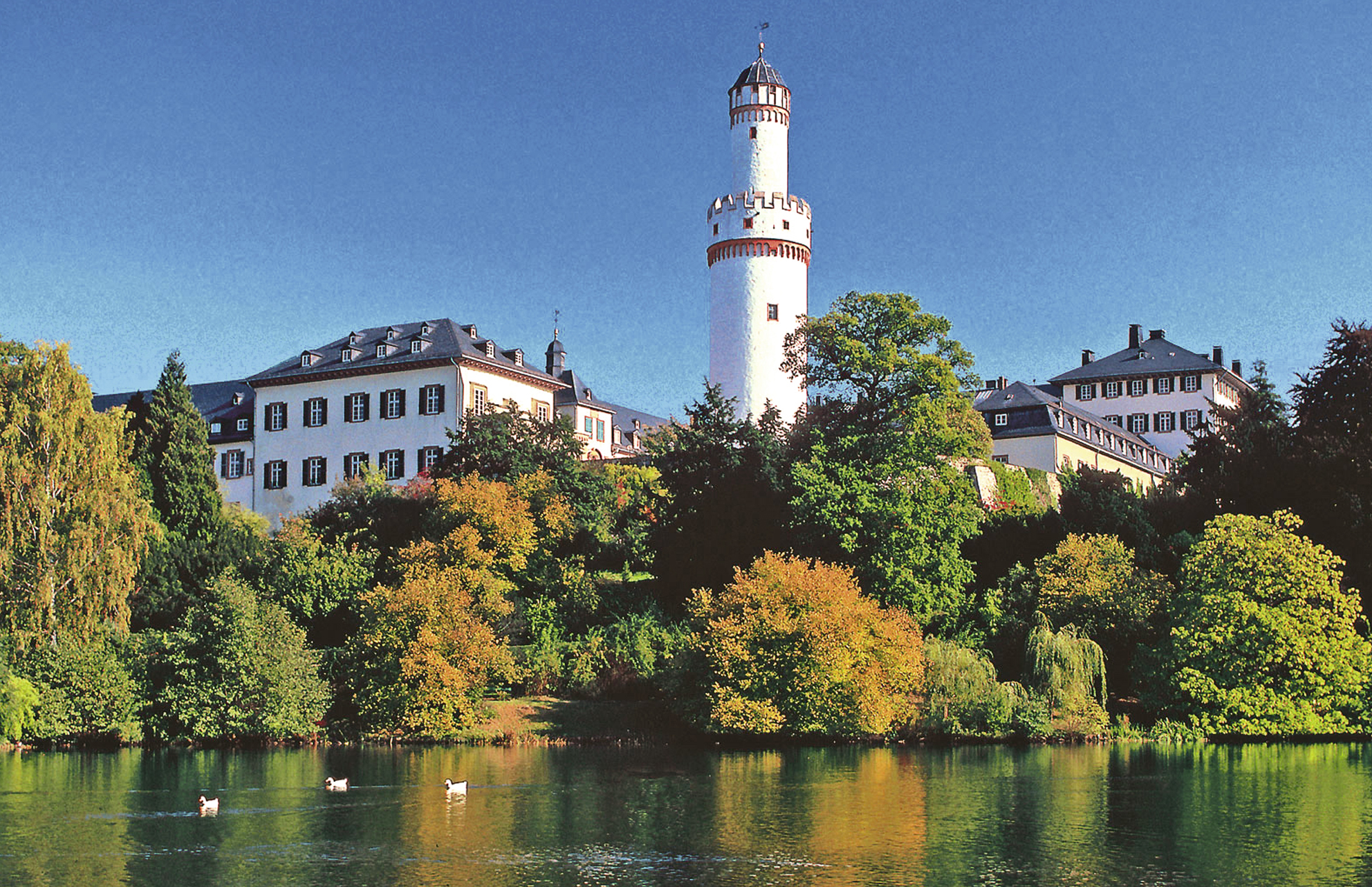
Bad Homburg Castle, with the White Tower (Weißer Turm) in the centre

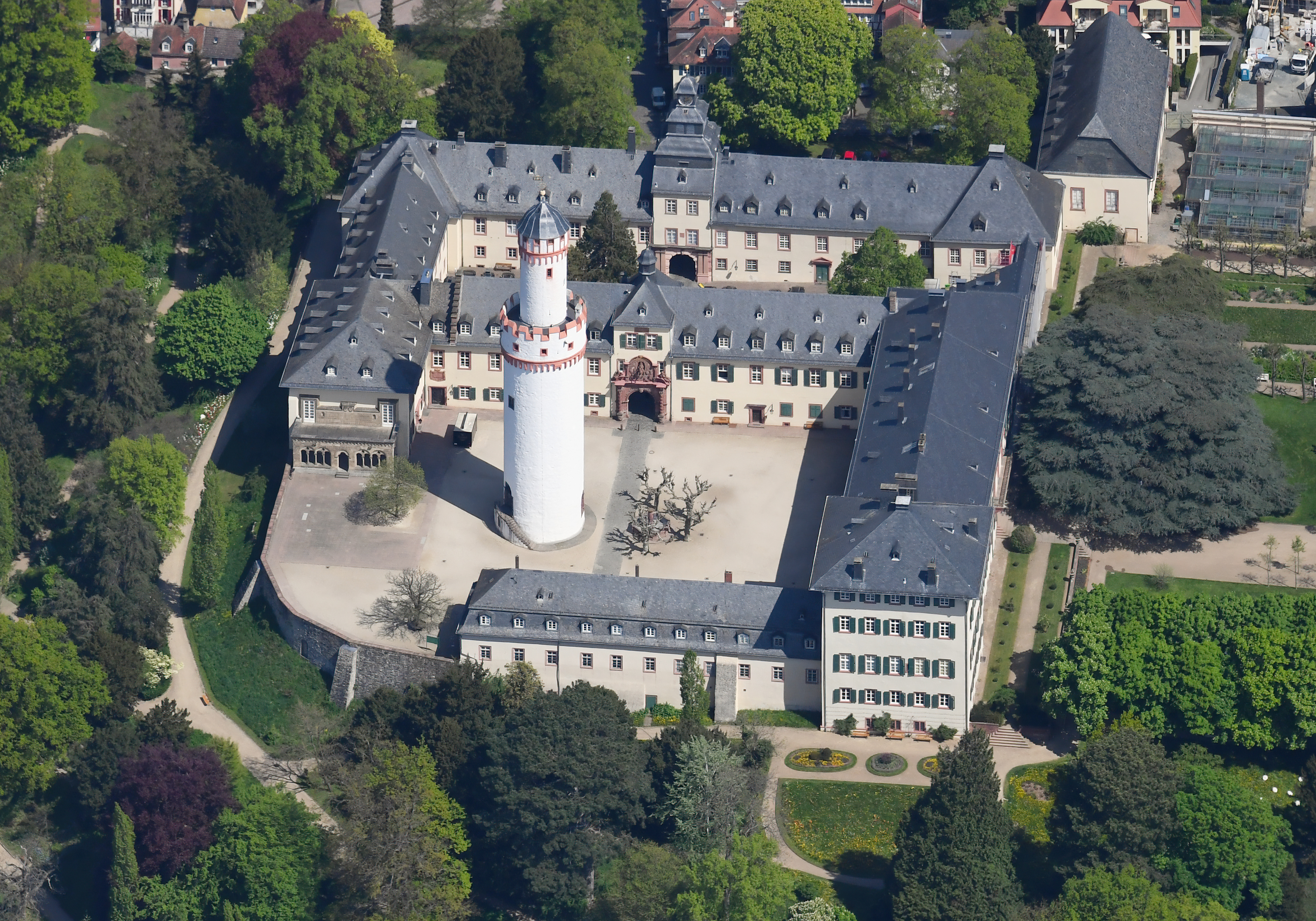
Aerial view from the south

Bad Homburg Castle (Schloss Bad Homburg) or Homburg Palace is a castle and palace in the German city of Bad Homburg vor der Höhe. Originally the residence of the Landgraves of Hesse-Homburg, it was first built in the 12th century.

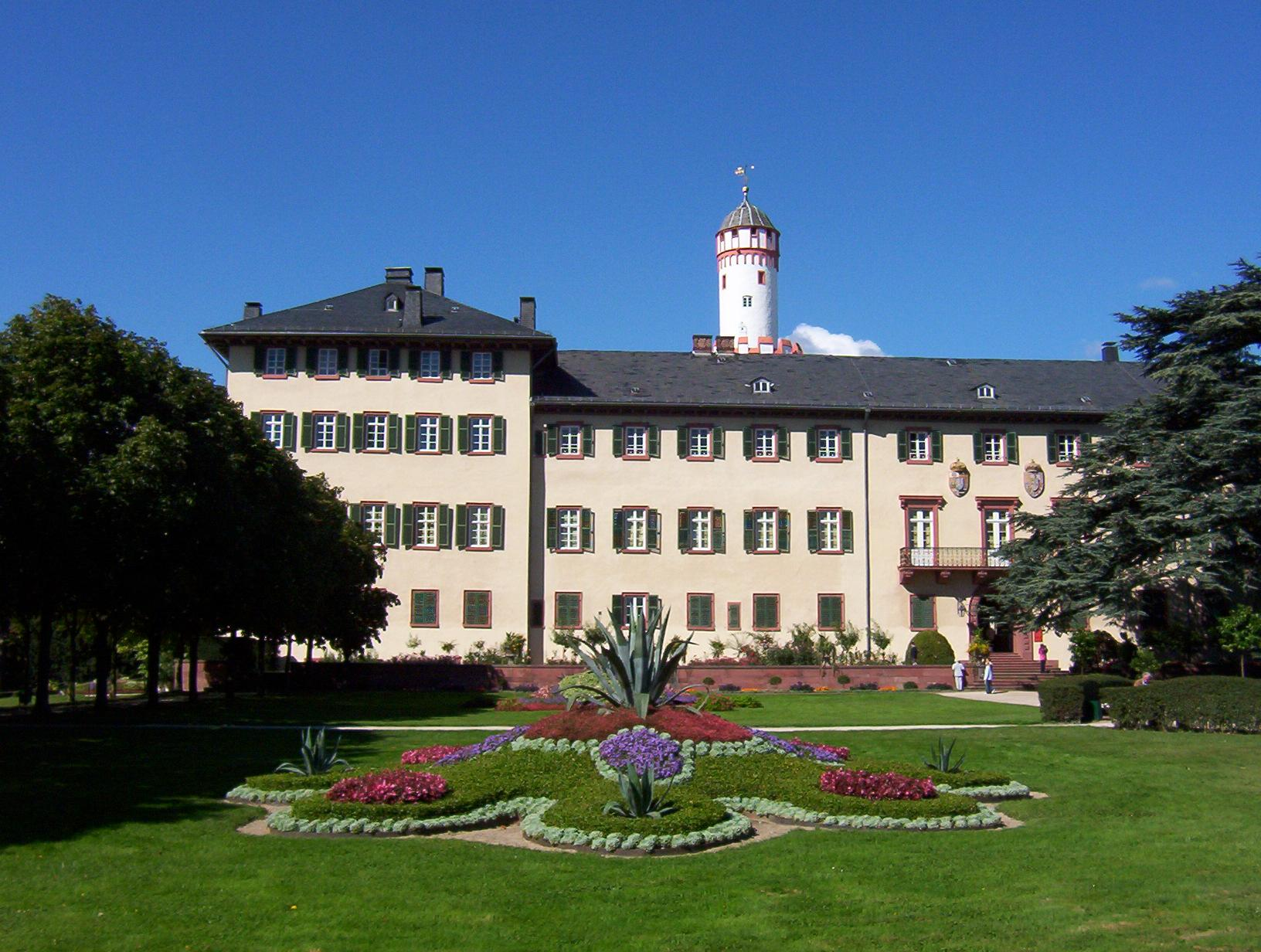
View from the park

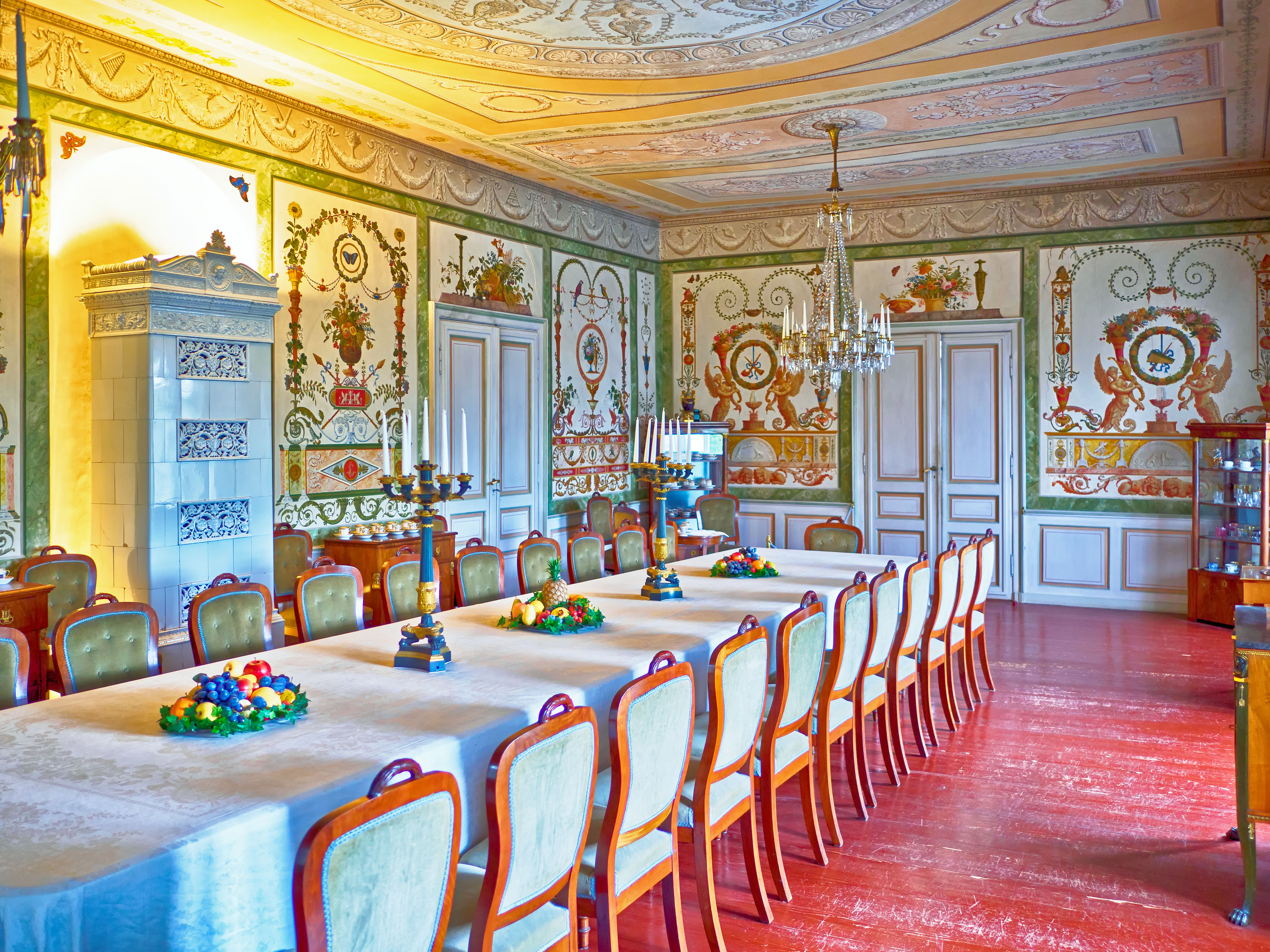
Dining room in the English wing

All but the keep was demolished in 1660 by Frederick II, Landgrave of Hesse-Homburg. He replaced the old castle with a new one designed by Paul Andrich between 1680 and 1685. Its grounds and gardens were landscaped in the 18th and 19th centuries, including the addition of the Gothic House. It was built for Princess Elizabeth, a daughter of King George III of the United Kingdom, the wife of Frederick VI, Landgrave of Hesse-Homburg. The couple had the palace renovated and furnished in contemporary style, including the English Wing. In particular, the British princess realized her passion for garden art, which can still be experienced in the castle park today.

After Prussia's annexation of Hesse-Homburg in 1866 following the Austro-Prussian War, it became a summer residence for the kings of Prussia. William I stayed at the castle several times, as did his son and successor Frederick III and Frederick's wife Victoria, a daughter of the British Queen Victoria. The castle was a particular favourite of Frederick and he added bathrooms, telephone rooms and electricity and merged some rooms. His son William II and the latter's wife Augusta Victoria also used the palace as a summer residence and refurbished the Royal Wing.

After the German Revolution of 1918–1919 the castle was administered by the Free State of Prussia. After Hitler came to power in 1933, he offered William II, who was living in exile in Huis Doorn in the Netherlands, a return to Germany to bring him under his control, and Homburg Palace as a residence, but the ex-Kaiser refused. After the dissolution of the state of Prussia in 1945, the palace was taken over by the state of Hesse. From 1947 it housed the Verwaltung der Staatlichen Schlösser und Gärten Hessen (Hesse Administration for State Castles and Gardens). Today, it is a museum.

== Bibliography (in German) ==
- Heinz Biehn, Wolfgang Einsingbach: Amtlicher Führer Schloss Homburg vor der Höhe. Herausgegeben von Verwaltung der Staatlichen Schlösser und Gärten in Hessen. Dt. Kunstverlag, München 1959
- Günther Binding: Beobachtungen und Grabungen im Schloss Bad Homburg vor der Höhe im Jahre 1962. In: Mitteilungen des Vereins für Geschichte und Landeskunde zu Bad Homburg vor der Höhe, Band 32 (1974)
- Rüdiger Kurth: Vielleicht ist er Kaiser Barbarossa begegnet. (W)Ortwin von Hohenberch und seine Burg, in: Jahrbuch des Hochtaunuskreises 2006. Frankfurt 2005, S. 94–98
- Friedrich Lotz: Geschichte der Stadt Bad Homburg vor der Höhe. 2 Bände:
  - Band 1: Begegnung mit Urkunden. Kramer, Frankfurt 1964
  - Band 2: Die Landgrafenzeit. Kramer, Frankfurt 1972, ISBN 3-7829-0133-9
- Fried Lübbecke: Kleines Vaterland Homburg vor der Höhe. Frankfurt 1964
- Bernd Modrow, Claudia Gröschel: Fürstliches Vergnügen. 400 Jahre Gartenkultur in Hessen. Verlag Schnell + Steiner, Regensburg 2002, ISBN 3-7954-1487-3
- Bernd Modrow: Schlosspark Homburg vor der Höhe. Vom Burggarten zum Schlosspark, Verlag Schnell + Steiner, Regensburg, 1. Auflage 2007, ISBN 978-3-7954-1966-0
- Iris Reepen, Claudia Göschel: Landgräfin Elisabeth, ihre Wohnung in Schloss Homburg und ihre Gärten. Verlag Ausbildung und Wissen, Bad Homburg 1998, ISBN 3-7954-1346-X
