= Wilhelm, Prince of Solms-Braunfels =

William
- Prince of Solms-Braunfels
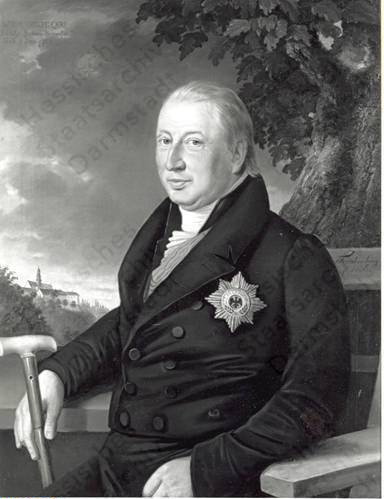
- Born: 9 January 1759; Braunfels
- Died: 20 March 1837 (aged 78); Braunfels
- Spouse: Wild- und Rheingräfin Auguste of Salm-Grumbach; Elisabetha Becker
- House: House of Solms-Braunfels
- Father: Ferdinand William Ernest, Prince of Solms-Braunfels
- Mother: Countess Sophie of Solms-Laubach
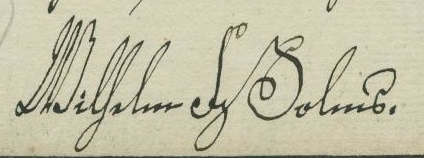
- Signature

Wilhelm Christian Karl, 3rd Prince of Solms Braunfels (9 January 1759, in Braunfels – 20 March 1837, in Braunfels) was by succession an immediate Prince, then a nobleman and head of the Princely House of Solms-Braunfels, a Prussian major general and Hessian deputy.

== Life ==
=== Family ===
William was a member of the Princely House of Solms-Braunfels. His grandfather Frederick William (1696–1761) was the first Prince of Solms-Braunfels. His parents were the imperial colonel and lieutenant general of the United Provinces Ferdinand Wilhelm Ernst (1721–1783) and Countess Sophie Christine Wilhelmine of Solms-Laubach. first daughter and second child of Christian August, Count of Solms-Laubach. Prussian Major General Frederick William (1770–1814) was one of his younger brothers.

On 6 October 1792, he married Wild- und Rheingräfin Auguste of Salm-Grumbach (1771–1810) half-sister of Friedrich, Prince of Salm-Horstmar. They had four children:

- Wilhelmine (1793–1865) ∞ Alexius, Prince of Bentheim and Steinfurt (1781–1866) and had issue
- Sophie Auguste (1796–1855) ∞ Johann August Karl, Prince of Wied (1779–1836) and had issue; they were the paternal grandparents of Queen Elisabeth of Romania
- Ferdinand, 4th Prince of Solms-Braunfels (1797–1873) ∞ Countess Ottilie of Solms-Laubach (1807–1884), without issue
- Karl Wilhelm Bernhard (1800–1868), General of Cavalry

By his maitresse Anna Elisabeth Becker (1779–1852), whom he married morganatically once widower, he had three children who received patronymic Wilhelmi

== Ancestry ==
Ancestors of Wilhelm, Prince of Solms-Braunfels

16. William II., Count of Solms-Braunfels-Greifenstein
8. William Maurice, Count of Solms-Braunfels
17. Countess Johannetta Sibylla of Solms-Hohensolms
4. Frederick William, 1st Prince of Solms-Braunfels
18. William Christoph, Landgrave of Hesse-Homburg
9. Landgravine Magdalene Sophie of Hesse-Homburg
19. Landgravine Sophie Eleonore of Hesse-Darmstadt
2. Ferdinand William Ernest, 2nd Prince of Solms-Braunfels
20. Frederick, Count of Nassau-Weilburg
10. John Ernest, 1st Prince of Nassau-Weilburg
21. Countess Christiane Elizabeth of Sayn-Wittgenstein-Homburg
5. Princess Magdalena Henrietta of Nassau-Weilburg
22. Frederick Emich, Count of Leiningen-Dagsburg-Hartenburg
11. Countess Marie Polyxene of Leiningen-Dagsburg-Hartenburg
23. Countess Sibylla of Waldeck-Wildungen
1. William, Prince of Solms-Braunfels
24. John Frederick, Count of Solms-Laubach
12. Frederick Ernest, Count of Solms-Laubach
25. Countess Beninga of Promnitz
6. Christian August, Count of Solms-Laubach
26. Louis Christian, Count of Stolberg-Gedern
13. Countess Fredericka Charlotte of Stolberg-Gedern
27. Duchess Christine of Mecklenburg-Güstrow
3. Countess Sophie Christine Wilhelmine of Solms-Laubach
28. William Maurice I, Count of Isenburg and Budingen in Birstein
14. Wolfgang Ernest I, 1st Prince of Isenburg and Budingen in Birstein
29. Countess Anna Amalia of Ysenburg-Budingen
7. Princess Elizabeth of Isenburg and Budingen in Birstein
30. Emich XIV, Count of Leiningen-Dagsburg-Hardenburg
15. Countess Friederike of Leiningen-Dagsburg-Hartenburg
31. Countess Palatine Elizabeth Christine of Zweibrucken-Landsberg
