= Christine Charlotte of Solms-Braunfels =

Princess of Hesse-Homburg (1690–1771)

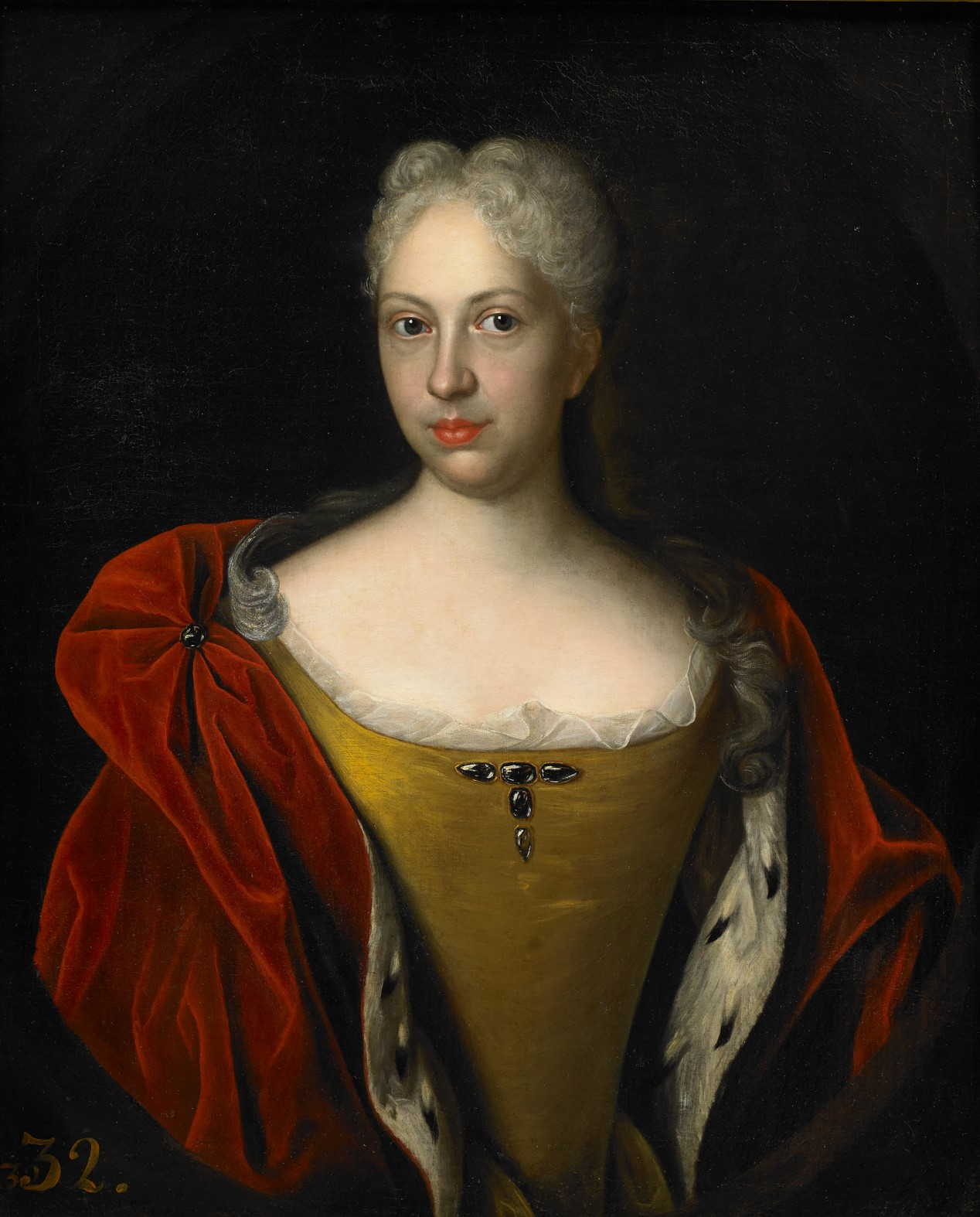
- Princess Christine Charlotte, c. 1724
- Born: 10 November 1690; Greifenstein
- Died: 16 October 1771 (aged 80); Homburg
- Spouse: Casimir William of Hesse-Homburg
- Issue: Frederick IV, Landgrave of Hesse-Homburg
- House: House of Solms-Braunfels
- Father: William Maurice of Solms-Braunfels
- Mother: Magdalena Sophie of Hesse-Homburg

Christine Charlotte of Solms-Braunfels (10 November 1690 in Greifenstein – 16 October 1771 in Homburg) was a Countess of Solms-Braunfels by birth and by marriage a princess of Hesse-Homburg. She served as regent of Hesse-Homburg during the minority of her son between 1727 and 1746.

== Life ==
Christine Charlotte was a daughter of Count William Maurice of Solms-Braunfels (1651–1720) from his marriage to Magdalena Sophie (1660–1720), the daughter of Landgrave William Christoph of Hesse-Homburg.

She married on 3 October 1722 in Braunfels to Landgrave Casimir William of Hesse-Homburg (1690–1726). They resided in Hötensleben. The princess took care of the education of her children; for this purpose she appointed the theologian August Friedrich Sack as court tutor. In 1727, he published his Conseils d'un ami à jeune homme qui entre dans le monde, describing the education of her son.

Casimir William died at the age of 36, shortly after the birth of their third child. In 1727, the Reichskammergericht in Wetzlar confirmed the appointment of Christine Charlotte as regent for her underage son.

Her brother Frederick William was raised to Imperial Prince in 1742. In 1746, her regency ended and her son became the ruling Landgrave of Hesse-Homburg.

== Issue ==
- Frederick IV Charles (1724–1751), ruling Landgrave of Hesse-Homburg

married in 1746 Princess Ulrike Louise of Solms-Braunfels (1731-1792)

- Eugene (1725-1725)
- Ulrike Sophie (1726–1792)
