= Prince Carl of Solms-Braunfels =

German prince and military officer (1812 – 1875)

Prince Carl
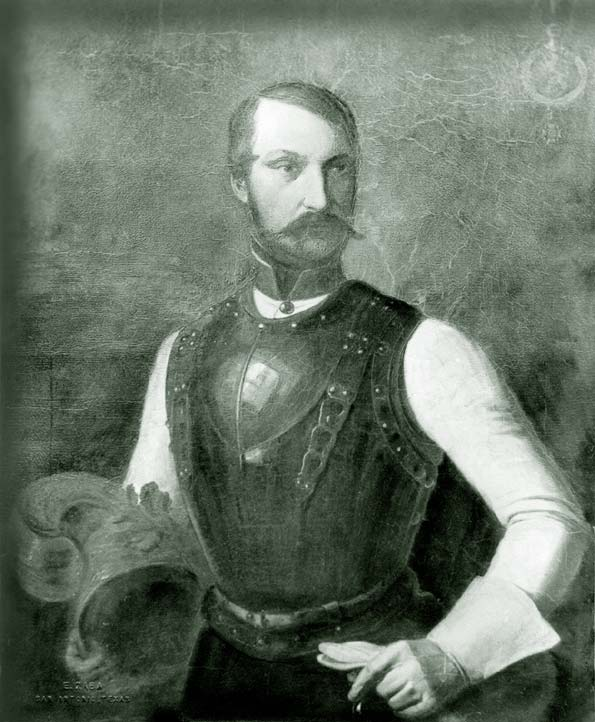
- Portrait, 1840s
- Born: 27 July 1812; Neustrelitz, Confederation of the Rhine
- Died: 13 November 1875 (aged 63); Rheingrafenstein, German Empire
- Spouse: Luise Auguste Stephanie Beyrich (m. 1834; div. 1841) Princess Sophie of Löwenstein-Wertheim-Rosenberg (m. 1845; died 1875)
- Issue: Marie von Schönau de Solms; Karl Louis von Schönau de Solms; Melanie von Schönau de Solms; Prince Ludwig; Princess Eulalia; Princess Marie; Princess Sophie; Prince Alexander
Names
- Friedrich Wilhelm Karl Ludwig Georg Alfred Alexander
- Father: Prince Frederick William of Solms-Braunfels
- Mother: Frederica of Mecklenburg-Strelitz
- Religion: Lutheranism

Prince Carl (Karl) of Solms-Braunfels (27 July 1812 – 13 November 1875) was a German prince and military officer in both the Austrian army and the cavalry of the Grand Duchy of Hesse. As commissioner general of the Adelsverein, he spearheaded the establishment of colonies of German immigrants in Texas. Prince Solms named New Braunfels, Texas, in honor of his homeland.

== Early life ==
Prince Friedrich Wilhelm Karl Ludwig Georg Alfred Alexander of Solms-Braunfels was born in Neustrelitz. His father was Prince Friedrick Wilhelm of Solms-Braunfels, second husband of Princess Frederica of Mecklenburg-Strelitz, who bore 13 children during her three marriages.

== Career ==
Carl was well-educated, well-connected, and handsome. An adventure seeker, he became a captain in the cavalry in the Imperial Army of Austria in 1841.

During his service with the cavalry, Carl read books about Texas and became interested in joining the Adelsverein. Appointed its commissioner general in 1844, he was the motivating force for the first colony of German emigrants to Texas. He arrived on Texas soil in July 1844, making an exploratory tour as an advisor to the Adelsverein, which owned the rights to the Fisher–Miller Land Grant. Subsequently, Carl purchased an additional 1,300 acres (5.3 km^{2}) on the Guadalupe River on behalf of the Adelsverein, where he established the colony of New Braunfels, Texas. His vision cleared the path for John O. Meusebach to follow in 1845 as the organizer, negotiator, and political force needed for community-building structure in the "New Germany".

In anticipation of his marriage to Princess Maria Josephine Sophie, Prince Solms formed plans to build Sophienburg (Sophie's Castle), laying the cornerstone in New Braunfels in 1845. Sophie refused to leave Germany, and Carl never returned to Texas after his 3 December 1845 marriage to her.

=== Later life ===
After returning to Germany, he left the Austrian army and became a colonel in the cavalry of the Grand Duchy of Hesse in 1846. (Note: The Grand Duke Louis II happened to be Carl's second cousin once removed, since Carl's grandmother Friederike Caroline Luise had been a Hessian princess.) He was able to rejoin the Austrian army in 1850, becoming a brigadier in 1859 with command of dragoons on Lake Constance. He took part in the 1866 Austro-Prussian War. He retired as a Feldmarschallleutnant (lieutenant general) in 1868 to his residence at the estate of Rheingrafenstein near Kreuznach on the Nahe River.

== Personal life ==
Although he was the landless, younger son of a younger son of a minor German prince, whose realm had been mediatized in 1806, (Note: From the maternal side Carl was, however, of the highest nobility. In 1834, his mother was the Duchess of Cumberland and future Queen of Hanover, her brother George was the ruling Grand Duke of the sovereign state of Mecklenburg-Strelitz, and the incumbent Empress Consort of Russia (Alexandra Feodorovna), a future King of Prussia (Frederick William IV), and a future German Emperor (William I) were Carl's first cousins.) Friedrich's 1834 marriage to Luise Auguste Stephanie Beyrich was considered below his princely station and had to be conducted morganatically. Together, they had three children:

- Marie von Schönau de Solms (b. 1835), who married Wilhelm Bähr.
- Karl Louis von Schönau de Solms (1837–1918), who married Wilhelmine Gantenhammer.
- Melanie von Schönau de Solms (b. 1840), who married Karl Heil.

In 1837, his mother became queen consort of Hanover. Shortly before she died in 1841, his stepfather, King Ernest Augustus, a member of the British royal family, succeeded in pressuring Friedrich to make a monetary arrangement with his wife and three children for a de facto royal annulment. Luise and her children were ennobled in the Grand Duchy of Hesse under the name von Schönau on 25 March 1841. The family was further ennobled in 1912 with the surname von Schönau de Solms.

=== Second marriage ===
On 3 December 1845, Prince Carl married Princess Maria Josephine Sophie of Löwenstein-Wertheim-Rosenberg, widow of Prince Franz of Salm-Salm. The union produced five children:

- Prince Ludwig of Solms-Braunfels (1847–1900)
- Princess Eulalia of Solms-Braunfels (1851–1922), who married Prince Edouard of Ligne, a son of Eugène, 8th Prince of Ligne.
- Princess Marie of Solms-Braunfels (1852–1882)
- Princess Sophie of Solms-Braunfels (1853–1869)
- Prince Alexander of Solms-Braunfels (1855–1926)

Prince Solms died at Rheingrafenstein on 13 November 1875 and is interred in the city cemetery of Bad Kreuznach.

== Timeline ==
Timeline of the life of Prince Carl (Karl) of Solms-Braunfels
Year	Event
1812	27 July – Friedrich Wilhelm Karl Ludwig Georg Alfred Alexander is born in Neustrelitz
1834	Marries Louise Auguste Stephanie Beyrich, later von Schönau, mother to three of his children
1841	Separates from Louise to save his career
1842	Joins the Adelsverein
1844	Commissioner General of the first colony that the society proposed to establish in Texas; 1 July – Arrives in Galveston, purchases land on Matagorda Bay to be called Carlshafen, or Indianola
1845	Secures title to 1,265 acres (5.12 km^{2}) of the Veramendi grant, including the Comal Springs and River, for the Adelsverein; 21 March – Founds New Braunfels; 15 May – Returns to Germany; 3 December – Marries the widow Maria Josephine Sophie, widow of Prince Franz of Salm-Salm and princess of Lowenstein-Wertheim-Rosenberg, mother to five of Carl's children
1846	Leaves the Austrian army – becomes a Colonel in the cavalry of the Grand Duchy of Hesse
1850	Rejoins the Austrian army
1859	Becomes a brigadier with command of dragoons on Lake Constance
1866	Takes part in Austria's war against Prussia.
1868	Retires as a Feldmarschallleutnant (Lieutenant General) to Rheingrafenstein near Kreuznach on the Nahe River
1875	13 November – dies Is interred in the city cemetery of Bad Kreuznach

== Ancestry ==
Ancestors of Prince Carl of Solms-Braunfels

8. Frederick William, Prince of Solms-Braunfels
4. Ferdinand Wilhelm Ernst, Prince of Solms-Braunfels
9. Princess Magdalene Henriette of Nassau-Weilburg
2. Prince Frederick William of Solms-Braunfels
10. Christian August, Count of Solms-Laubach
5. Countess Sophie of Solms-Laubach
11. Princess Elisabeth of Isenburg and Büdingen in Birstein
1. Prince Carl of Solms-Braunfels
12. Duke Charles Louis Frederick of Mecklenburg-Strelitz
6. Charles II, Grand Duke of Mecklenburg-Strelitz
13. Princess Elisabeth Albertine of Saxe-Hildburghausen
3. Duchess Frederica of Mecklenburg-Strelitz
14. Prince George William of Hesse-Darmstadt
7. Princess Friederike of Hesse-Darmstadt
15. Countess Maria Louise Albertine of Leiningen-Dagsburg-Falkenburg
