= Prince Frederick William of Solms-Braunfels =

Prussian general

Prince Frederick William
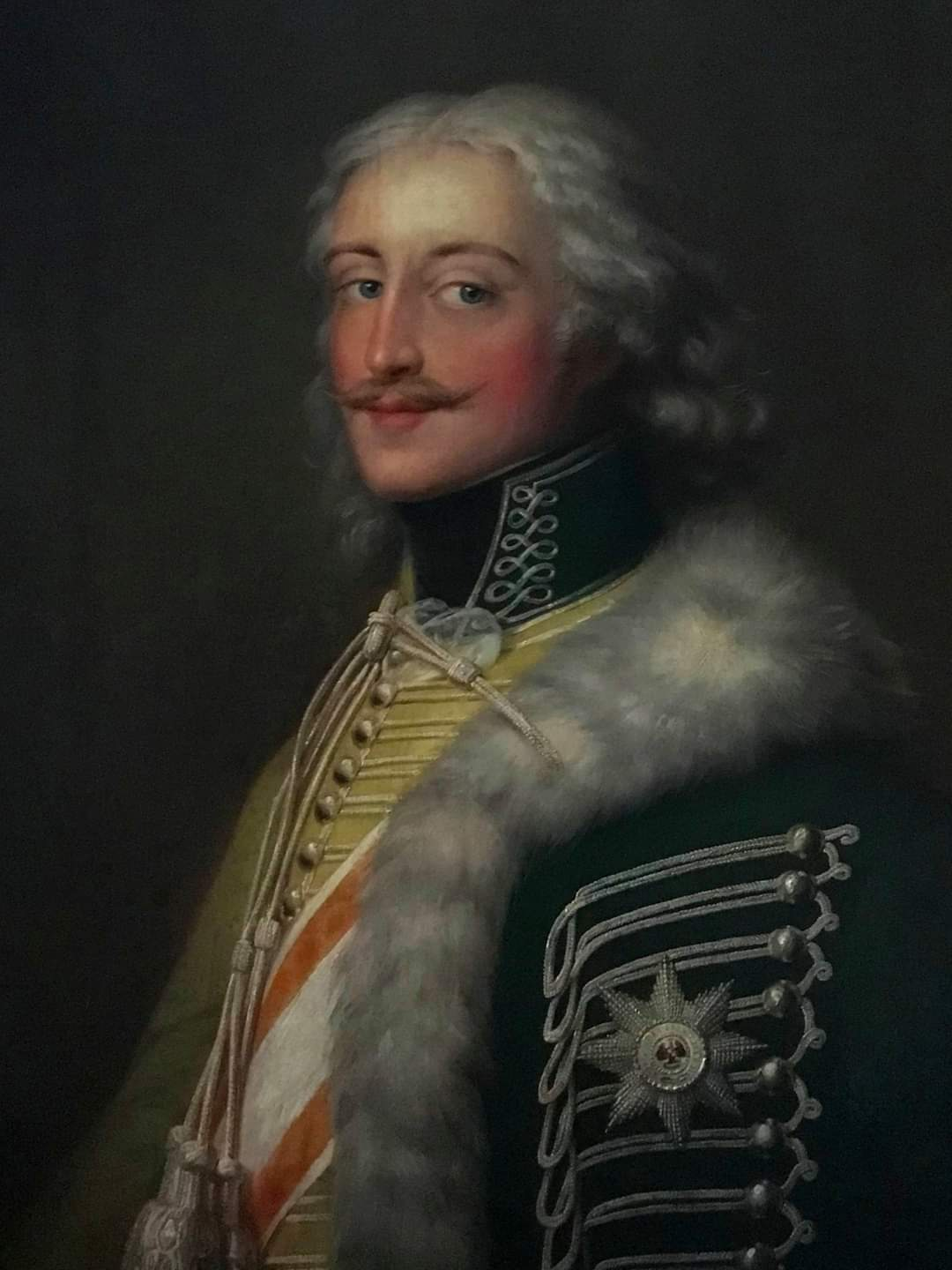
- Portrait, late 18th/early 19th century
- Born: 22 October 1770; Braunfels
- Died: 13 April 1814 (aged 43); Sławięcice
- Spouse: Frederica of Mecklenburg-Strelitz (m. 1798)
- Issue among others: Prince Wilhelm of Solms-Braunfels; Augusta, Princess of Schwarzburg-Rudolstadt; Prince Alexander of Solms-Braunfels; Prince Carl of Solms-Braunfels
- House: House of Solms-Braunfels
- Father: Ferdinand William Ernest, Prince of Solms-Braunfels
- Mother: Countess Sophie Christine Wilhelmine of Solms-Laubach

Prince Frederick William of Solms-Braunfels (22 October 1770 – 13 April 1814) was a Prussian Major General and by birth a member of the House of Solms-Braunfels.

== Early life ==
He was the fifth son of Ferdinand William Ernest, 2nd Prince of Solms-Braunfels and his wife, Countess Sophie Christine Wilhelmine of Solms-Laubach.

== Biography ==
He became known mainly through his marriage to Princess Frederica of Mecklenburg-Strelitz. She was the widow of Prince Louis Charles of Prussia. When she became pregnant in 1798, he married her in order to avoid a scandal. The daughter died soon after birth. Frederick William was alleged to have been strongly inclined to consume alcohol and had to quit military service in 1805 for health reasons. He also lost his income and even his brother advised Frederica to divorce. She was initially against it, but when in 1813, she met Ernest Augustus, King of Hanover, she, too, wanted the divorce. Before they got around to it, however, Frederick William died, in 1814 in Sławięcice.

== Marriage and issue ==
From his marriage to Duchess Frederica of Mecklenburg-Strelitz, the following children are known:

- Princess Sophia of Solms-Braunfels (born: 27 February 1799; died: 20 October 1799).
- Prince Frederick Wilhelm (born: 11 September 1800; died: 14 September 1800).
- Prince Frederick Wilhelm Henry Casimir of Solms-Braunfels (1801–1868); married in 1831 Countess Maria Anna Kinsky von Wchinitz und Tettau (1809–1892).
- Princess Louise Augusta of Solms-Braunfels (1804–1865); married in 1827 Prince Albert of Schwarzburg-Rudolstadt (1867 Prince) (1798–1869).
- Unnamed daughter (1805–1805).
- Prince Alexander Frederick Louis of Solms-Braunfels (1807–1867); married in 1863 Baroness Louise von Landsberg-Velen (1835–1894).
- Prince Frederick William Carl of Solms-Braunfels (1812–1875); married firstly from 1834-1841 (morganatic marriage) Louise Beyrich, and secondly, in 1845, Princess Sophie von Löwenstein-Wertheim-Rosenberg (1814–1876).

== Ancestry ==
Ancestors of Prince Frederick William of Solms-Braunfels

16. William II, Count of Solms-Braunfels-Greifenstein
8. William Maurice, Count of Solms-Braunfels
17. Countess Johannetta Sibylla of Solms-Hohensolms
4. Frederick William, Prince of Solms-Braunfels
18. William Christoph, Landgrave of Hesse-Homburg
9. Landgravine Magdalene Sophie of Hesse-Homburg
19. Landgravine Sophie Eleonore of Hesse-Darmstadt
2. Ferdinand, Prince of Solms-Braunfels
20. Frederick, Count of Nassau-Weilburg
10. John Ernest, 1st Prince of Nassau-Weilburg
21. Countess Christiane Elizabeth of Sayn-Wittgenstein-Homburg
5. Princess Magdalena Henrietta of Nassau-Weilburg
22. Frederick Emich, Count of Leiningen-Dagsburg-Hartenburg
11. Countess Marie Polyxene of Leiningen-Dagsburg-Hartenburg
23. Countess Sibylla of Waldeck-Wildungen
1. Prince Frederick William of Solms-Braunfels
24. John Frederick, Count of Solms-Laubach
12. Frederick Ernest, Count of Solms-Laubach
25. Countess Beninga of Promnitz
6. Christian August, Count of Solms-Laubach
26. Louis Christian, Count of Stolberg-Gedern
13. Countess Fredericka Charlotte of Stolberg-Gedern
27. Duchess Christine of Mecklenburg-Güstrow
3. Countess Sophie Christine Wilhelmine of Solms-Laubach
28. William Maurice I, Count of Isenburg and Budingen in Birstein
14. Wolfgang Ernest I, 1st Prince of Isenburg and Budingen in Birstein
29. Countess Anna Amalia of Ysenburg and Budingen
7. Princess Elizabeth of Isenburg and Budingen in Birstein
30. Emich XIV, Count of Leiningen-Dagsburg-Hardenburg
15. Countess Friederike of Leiningen-Dagsburg-Hartenburg
31. Countess Palatine Elizabeth Christine of Zweibrücken-Landsberg
