= Frederica of Mecklenburg-Strelitz =

Queen of Hanover from 1837 to 1841

- Princess Louis Charles of Prussia; Princess Frederick William of Solms-Braunfels; Duchess of Cumberland and Teviotdale
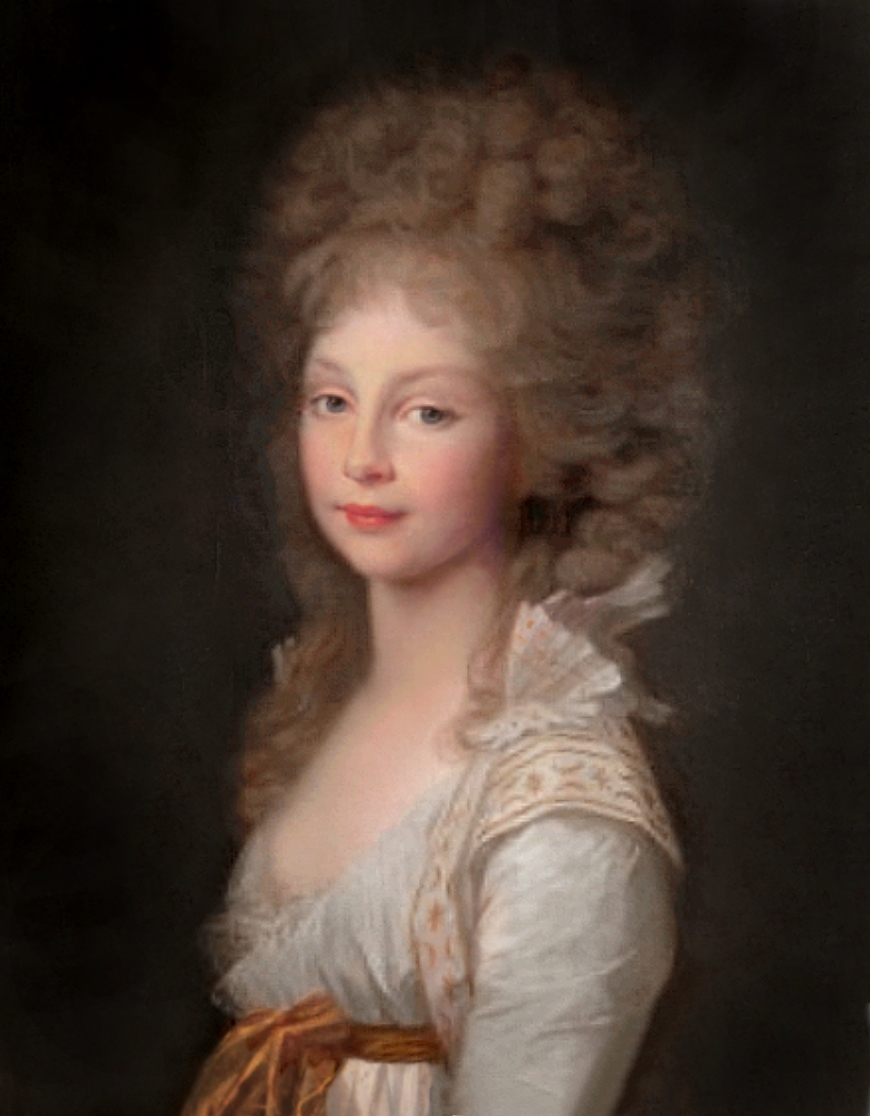
- Portrait by Johann Friedrich August Tischbein, 1796

Queen consort of Hanover
- Tenure: 20 June 1837 – 29 June 1841
- Born: 3 March 1778; Electorate of Hanover, Holy Roman Empire
- Died: 29 June 1841 (aged 63); Kingdom of Hanover
- Burial: Herrenhausen Gardens, Hanover
- Spouse: Prince Louis Charles of Prussia (m. 1793; died 1796) Prince Frederick William of Solms-Braunfels (m. 1798; died 1814) Ernest Augustus, King of Hanover (m. 1815)
- Issue among others: Prince Frederick of Prussia; Frederica, Duchess of Anhalt-Dessau; Prince Wilhelm of Solms-Braunfels; Augusta, Princess of Schwarzburg-Rudolstadt; Prince Alexander of Solms-Braunfels; Prince Carl of Solms-Braunfels; George V of Hanover
Names
- Frederica Louise Caroline Sophie Alexandrina; German: Friederike Luise Caroline Sophie Alexandrine
- House: Mecklenburg-Strelitz
- Father: Charles II, Grand Duke of Mecklenburg-Strelitz
- Mother: Princess Friederike of Hesse-Darmstadt

Frederica of Mecklenburg-Strelitz (German: Friederike Luise Caroline Sophie Alexandrine; 3 March 1778 – 29 June 1841) was Queen of Hanover from 20 June 1837 until her death in 1841 as the wife of King Ernest Augustus. She was a German princess who married successively Prince Louis Charles of Prussia, Prince Frederick William of Solms-Braunfels, and her first cousin Ernest Augustus. Through her 1815 marriage to Ernest, then Duke of Cumberland, Frederica became a British princess and Duchess of Cumberland. Ernest was the fifth son and eighth child of Queen Charlotte and King George III of the United Kingdom, Frederica's paternal aunt and her husband.

Frederica was born in the Altes Palais of Hanover as the fifth daughter of Charles II, Duke of Mecklenburg-Strelitz, and Princess Friederike of Hesse-Darmstadt. Her father assumed the title of Grand Duke of Mecklenburg on 18 June 1815.

== Early life ==
Frederica's mother died on 22 May 1782 after giving birth to her tenth child. Two years later (28 September 1784), her father remarried the younger sister of his deceased wife, Princess Charlotte of Hesse-Darmstadt, but this union ended just one year later, when Charlotte died of complications resulting from childbirth on 12 December 1785.

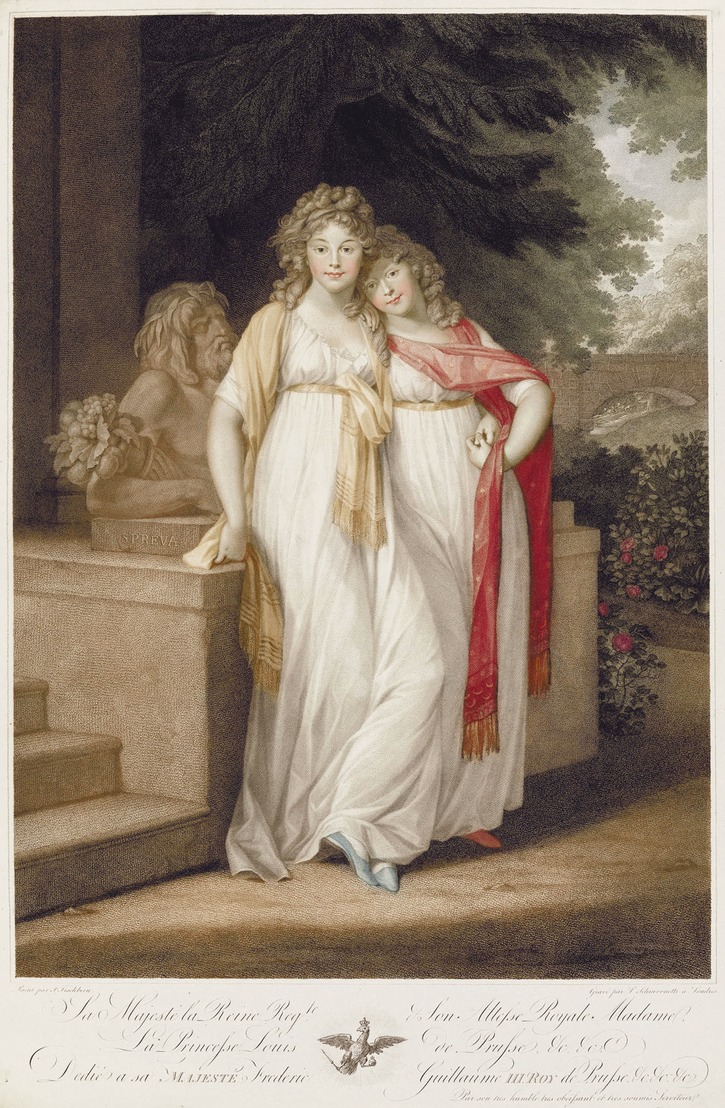
Princess Frederica of Prussia with her sister Louise in 1795.

The twice-widowed Duke Charles considered himself unable to give his daughters proper rearing and education, so he sent Frederica and her elder sisters Charlotte, Therese and Louise to their maternal grandmother, Princess Maria Louise of Hesse-Darmstadt. Maria Louise's choice of a Swiss teacher for the girls, Salomé de Gélieu, proved to be a good one. Some time later, Duke Charles also sent his two surviving sons, George and Charles, to be raised by their grandmother.

== First marriage ==
Frederica's father was anxious to arrange advantageous marriages for all his daughters, and used family connections to bring this about. Queen Frederika Louisa of Hesse-Darmstadt, wife of King Frederick William II, was a first cousin of Frederica's mother. Frederica's father broached with the Prussian royal family the idea of marriage between their children, and the Prussians were not averse. On 14 March 1793, the Mecklenburg-Strelitz duchesses "coincidentally" met King Frederick William II of Prussia at the Prussian Theatre in Frankfurt-am-Main. He was immediately captivated by the grace and charm of both sisters, Frederica and Louise. The pending marriage negotiations received traction, and within weeks, the matter was settled: Frederica's elder sister Louise would marry Crown Prince Frederick William, and Frederica would marry his younger brother Prince Louis.

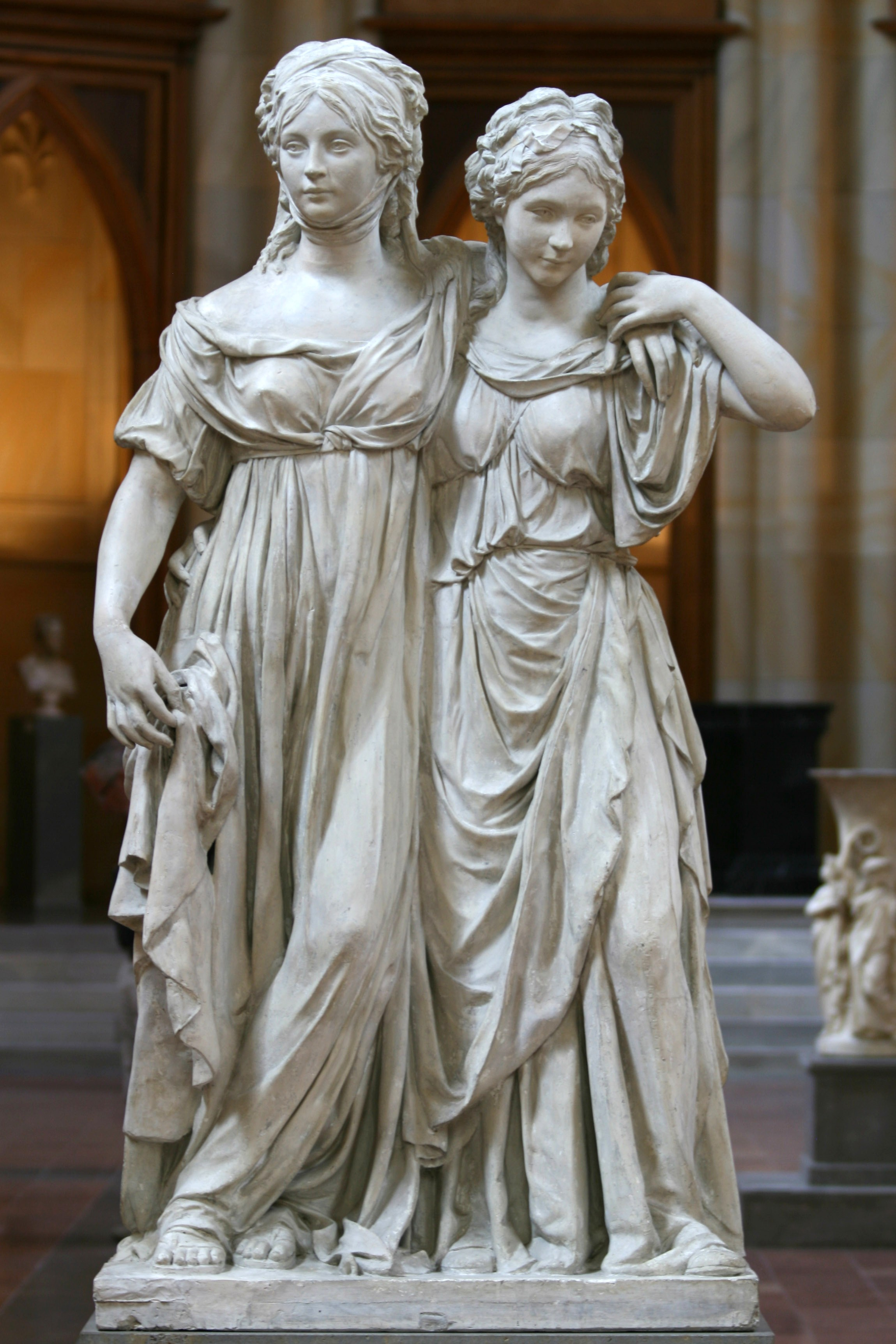
Famous Schadow statue of Frederica (right) and her sister Louise of Mecklenburg-Strelitz. The statue was initially deemed too erotic, and was consequently closed to public viewing.

The double engagement was celebrated in Darmstadt on 24 April 1793, only a few weeks after the sisters fortuitously met their future father-in-law at the theatre. On 24 December, Duchess Louise and Crown Prince Frederick William were married in the Royal Palace of Berlin; two days later, on 26 December, Duchess Frederica and Prince Louis were also married at the same venue.

Unlike her sister, Frederica did not enjoy a happy marriage. Although her husband died only three years after the wedding, Frederica did bear him three children in as many years: Frederick in 1794; a short-lived son, Charles, in 1795; and a daughter, Frederica, in 1796.

In 1795, King Frederick William II appointed Louis as Chief of the Dragoons Regiment No.1, which was stationed in Schwedt. One year later, on 23 December 1796, Prince Louis died of diphtheria. It was three years almost to the day since their wedding. At this time, his youngest child, Frederica, was less than three months old, and his eldest son was hardly two years old. After Louis's death, his father provided Frederica with a suitable residence near Berlin, and a sufficient income, and she moved with her three children to Schönhausen Palace near Berlin.

In 1797, Frederica became unofficially engaged to her cousin Prince Adolphus, Duke of Cambridge, seventh son of King George III of Great Britain and Queen Charlotte (Frederica's paternal aunt). The Duke of Cambridge asked the consent of his father to the marriage. The King did not refuse his consent but asked his son to wait until the ongoing war with France was over. The relationship eventually ended, with rumors circulating that either Adolphus had offered to release Frederica from the engagement, or – as Queen Charlotte believed – Frederica had jilted him for another man.

== Second marriage ==
In 1798, Frederica became pregnant. The father was Prince Frederick William of Solms-Braunfels. The prince recognized his paternity and requested her hand in marriage, a proposal that was quickly granted in order to avoid scandal. On 10 December that year, the couple were married in Berlin and immediately moved to Ansbach. Two months later, in February 1799, Frederica gave birth to a daughter who only lived eight months. Prince Frederick William, disappointed and embittered, resumed his old dissipated lifestyle and became an alcoholic. In 1805, he resigned his military posts for "health reasons". Frederica had to maintain her family with her own resources after her former brother-in-law Frederick William III refused to restore her annual pension as a dowager princess of Prussia. William Christian, Prince of Solms-Braunfels, Frederica's brother-in-law and head of the family, advised her to get a divorce, with his full approval. She and her husband nonetheless refused.

== Third marriage ==
In May 1813, during a visit to his uncle Duke Charles in Neustrelitz, Prince Ernest Augustus, Duke of Cumberland and Teviotdale, the fifth son of King George III, met and fell in love with Frederica, who was his first cousin. Duke Charles made it clear to his daughter that her separation from the Prince of Solms-Braunfels was absolutely logical, and that he saw a marriage with an English prince as a great opportunity for her. During the next months Frederica considered the intentions of Ernest and the possible effects on her own situation. When, after the victory of the allies in the Battle of Leipzig, Ernest spent some days in Neustrelitz, he was greeted enthusiastically. Some time later Frederica asked the Prussian king for approval for her divorce from Prince Frederick William of Solms-Braunfels. All parties agreed, including the Prince of Solms-Braunfels, but Frederick William's sudden death on 13 April 1814 precluded the need for a divorce. The prince's demise was considered by some as a little too convenient, and some suspected that Frederica had poisoned him. In August, the engagement with Ernest was officially announced. After Ernest's eldest brother, George, Prince Regent, gave his consent to the wedding, Frederica and Ernest were married on 29 May 1815 at the parish church of Neustrelitz. Some time later, the couple traveled to Great Britain and married again on 29 August at Carlton House, London.

Queen Charlotte bitterly opposed the marriage, even though her future daughter-in-law was also her niece. She refused to attend the wedding and advised her son to live outside England with his wife. Frederica never obtained the favour of the Queen, who died unreconciled with her in 1818. During her marriage to Ernest she gave birth three times, but only a son survived, who would eventually become King George V of Hanover.

== Queen of Hanover ==
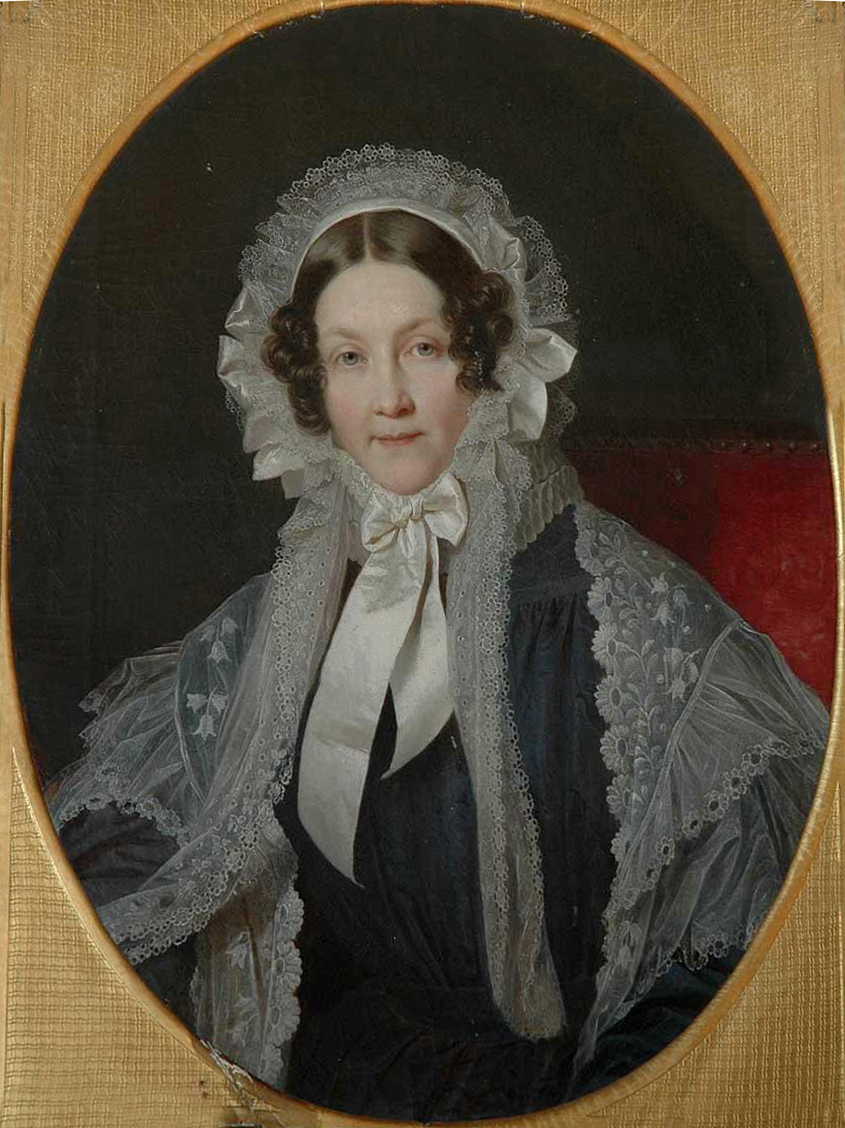
Portrait, late 1830s.

On 20 June 1837, King William IV of the United Kingdom and Hanover died without surviving legitimate issue. His heir was his niece Princess Victoria, but because Hanover had been ruled under semi-Salic Law since the times of the Holy Roman Empire, Victoria could not inherit the Hanoverian throne. The next male heir was Ernest Augustus, King William's brother, who then became King of Hanover, with Frederica as his queen consort.

After a short illness, Queen Frederica died on 29 June 1841 at Hanover. The Court master builder Georg Ludwig Friedrich Laves was instructed by the King to build a mausoleum for his wife and himself in the garden of the chapel at Herrenhausen Palace. He also gave royal orders for the transformation of a central square near the Leineschloss and renamed it Friederikenplatz in her honour.

== Children ==
Name	Birth	Death	Notes
By Prince Louis Charles of Prussia (married 29 December 1793; he died 23 December 1796)
Prince Frederick of Prussia	30 October 1794	27 July 1863	married, 1817, Princess Louise of Anhalt-Bernburg
Prince Charles of Prussia	26 September 1795	6 April 1798
Princess Frederica of Prussia	30 September 1796	1 January 1850	married, 1818, Leopold IV, Duke of Anhalt-Dessau
By Prince Frederick William of Solms-Braunfels (married 10 December 1798; he died 13 April 1814)
Princess Sophia of Solms-Braunfels	27 February 1799	20 October 1799
Prince Frederick of Solms-Braunfels	11 September 1800	14 September 1800
Prince Wilhelm of Solms-Braunfels	13 December 1801	12 September 1868	married, 1831, Countess Maria Kinsky von Wchinitz und Tettau
Princess Augusta of Solms-Braunfels	25 July 1804	8 October 1865	married, 1827, Albert, Prince of Schwarzburg-Rudolstadt
Stillborn daughter	1805		stillborn
Prince Alexander of Solms-Braunfels	12 March 1807	20 February 1867	married, 1863, Baroness Louise of Landsberg-Velen; had issue
Prince Carl of Solms-Braunfels	27 July 1812	13 November 1875	married, 1845, Princess Sophie of Löwenstein-Wertheim-Rosenberg
By Ernest Augustus, King of Hanover (married 29 May 1815)
Princess Frederica of Cumberland	27 January 1817		stillborn
Stillborn daughter	April 1818		stillborn
George V of Hanover	27 May 1819	12 June 1878	married, 1843, Princess Marie of Saxe-Altenburg; had issue, including Ernest Augustus, Crown Prince of Hanover

== Ancestry ==
Ancestors of Frederica of Mecklenburg-Strelitz

8. Adolphus Frederick II, Duke of Mecklenburg-Strelitz
4. Duke Charles Louis of Mecklenburg-Strelitz
9. Princess Christiane Emilie of Schwarzburg-Sondershausen
2. Charles II, Grand Duke of Mecklenburg-Strelitz
10. Ernest Frederick I, Duke of Saxe-Hildburghausen
5. Princess Elisabeth Albertine of Saxe-Hildburghausen
11. Countess Sophia Albertine of Erbach-Erbach
1. Princess Frederica of Mecklenburg-Strelitz
12. Louis VIII, Landgrave of Hesse-Darmstadt
6. Prince George William of Hesse-Darmstadt
13. Countess Charlotte of Hanau-Lichtenberg
3. Princess Friederike of Hesse-Darmstadt
14. Count Christian Karl of Leiningen-Dagsburg-Falkenburg
7. Countess Maria Louise Albertine of Leiningen-Dagsburg-Falkenburg
15. Countess Katharina Polyxena of Solms-Rödelheim-Assenheim

Frederica of Mecklenburg-Strelitz House of Mecklenburg-Strelitz Born: 3 March 1778 Died: 29 June 1841
Hanoverian royalty
Preceded by Adelaide of Saxe-Meiningen	Queen consort of Hanover; 20 June 1837 – 29 June 1841	Vacant Title next held by Marie of Saxe-Altenburg
