= Ferdinand, Prince of Solms-Braunfels =

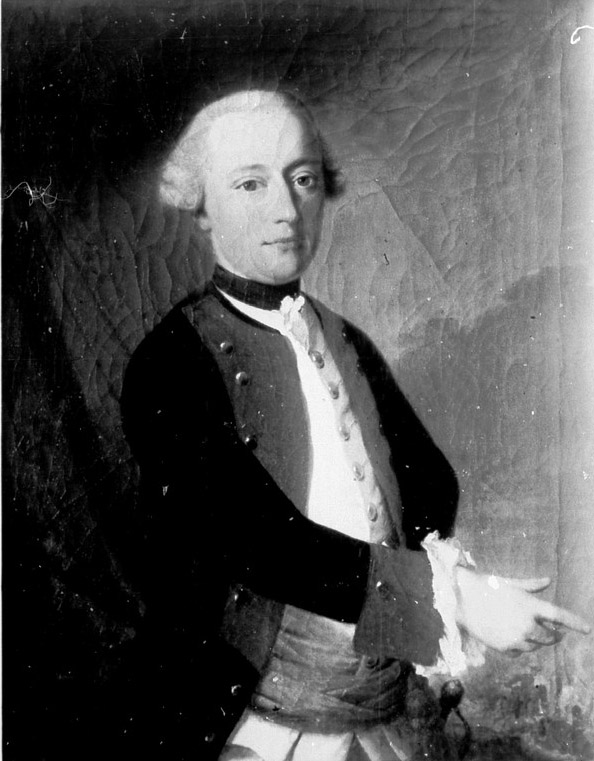
- Portrait c. 1761
- Born: 8 February 1721; Braunfels
- Died: 2 October 1783 (aged 62); Braunfels
- Spouse: Countess Sophie of Solms-Laubach
- Issue: Wilhelm, Prince of Solms-Braunfels; Prince Frederick William
- House: House of Solms-Braunfels
- Father: Frederick William, Prince of Solms-Braunfels
- Mother: Princess Magdalena Henrietta of Nassau-Weilburg

Ferdinand Wilhelm Ernst, 2nd Prince of Solms-Braunfels (8 February 1721 in Braunfels – 2 October 1783, ibid.) was the second Prince of Solms-Braunfels. He was the son of Frederick William, Prince of Solms-Braunfels, and his first wife Princess Magdalena Henrietta of Nassau-Weilburg.

== Life ==
Ferdinand Wilhelm Ernst was born in Braunfels, Solms-Braunfels as the first son and child of Frederick William, Count of Solms-Braunfels and his first wife Princess Magdalena Henriette of Nassau-Weilburg (1691–1725) daughter of Johann Ernst, Prince of Nassau-Weilburg. On 22 May 1742, Emperor Charles VII raised the House of Solms-Braunfels to the rank of Imperial Prince and so when his father died he succeeded him as the 2nd Prince.

In 1781, Johann Stephan Pütter, professor of law at Gottingen University, dedicated a volume on law titled Schediasma De Utilitate Et Praestantia Iuris Publici Specialis Singulorum Germaniae Territorium to Ernst.

== Marriage and issue ==
On 24 August 1756, he married in Laubach, Countess Sophie Christine Wilhelmine of Solms-Laubach. She was the first daughter and second child of Christian August, Count of Solms-Laubach, and his first wife, Princess Elisabeth of Isenburg und Büdingen zu Birstein, daughter of the first Prince, Wolfgang Ernest I. They had ten children:

- William Christian Carl, 3rd Prince of Solms-Braunfels (1759–1837), married Wild- und Rheingräfin Auguste of Salm-Grumbach and Elisabetha Becker, had issue from both marriages
- Princess Karoline Marie Eleonore of Solms-Braunfels (6 Oct 1760 – 30 Oct 1760)
- Prince Ludwig Wilhelm of Solms-Braunfels (12 Sep 1762 – 29 Oct 1762)
- Princess Auguste Luise of Solms-Braunfels (1764–1797) married Karl Ludwig, Wild- und Rheingraf zu Salm-Grumbach und Dhaun, whose first wife was Princess Marianne of Leiningen, daughter of Carl Friedrich Wilhelm, 1st Prince of Leiningen, and parents of her brother William's wife.
- Prince Wilhelm Henrich Kasimir of Solms-Braunfels (1765–1852) unmarried
- Princess Luise Karoline Sophie of Solms-Braunfels (1766–1830) unmarried
- Prince Karl August Wilhelm Friedrich (1768–1829) unmarried
- Prince Frederick William of Solms-Braunfels (1770–1814) married Princess Frederica of Mecklenburg-Strelitz, widow of Prince Louis Charles of Prussia, and had issue
- Prince Ludwig Wilhelm Christian of Solms-Braunfels (1771–1833) unmarried
- Princess Ferdinande Wilhelmine Isabelle of Solms-Braunfels (1772-1773), died in infancy
