= Anna Elisabeth of Saxe-Lauenburg =

- Born: 23 August 1624; Ratzeburg
- Died: 27 May 1688 (aged 63); Philippseck Castle in Butzbach
- Noble family: House of Ascania
- Spouse: William Christoph, Landgrave of Hesse-Homburg (m. 1665; div. 1672)
- Father: Augustus, Duke of Saxe-Lauenburg
- Mother: Elisabeth Sophie of Holstein-Gottorp

Anna Elisabeth of Saxe-Lauenburg (23 August 1624 in Ratzeburg – 27 May 1688 in Butzbach), was a princess of Saxe-Lauenburg by birth and by marriage landgravine of Hesse-Homburg.

== Life ==
Anna Elizabeth was a daughter of Duke Augustus of Saxe-Lauenburg (1577–1656) and his first wife Elisabeth Sophie (1599–1627), the daughter of the Duke John Adolf of Holstein-Gottorp.

She married on 2 April 1665 in Lübeck to Landgrave William Christoph of Hesse-Homburg (1625–1681). For William Christoph, it was his second marriage. Only two daughters from his first marriage to Sophia Eleonore of Hesse-Darmstadt had survived and it was hoped that the marriage with Anna Elisabeth would produce an heir. To William Christoph's surprise, the princess —whom the landgrave only knew from her portrait—, was physically challenged and unable to bear children. He married her, as he had promised, but soon sought a divorce. The divorce was officially pronounced on 24 August 1672. According to some sources, the Landgrave had hoped for a huge dowry, however, the dowry she brought in was rather modest. According to this theory, when her money had been used up, William Christoph called her unfit and filed for a divorce.

Anna Elisabeth received Philippseck Castle near Butzbach as her residence. She engaged in poor relief and founded schools in Bodenrod and Maibach. She died in Butzbach on 27 May 1688, at the age of 63, and was buried in the crypt below the choir of the church in Münster (a district of Butzbach).
