= Duchess of Cumberland =

Duchess of Cumberland is the principal courtesy title held by the wife of the Duke of Cumberland. Thus far only one woman has been Duchess of Cumberland alone but another has been Duchess of Cumberland & Strathearn and three more have been Duchess of Cumberland & Teviotdale. The latter title has been vacant since the dukedom's suspension in 1919.

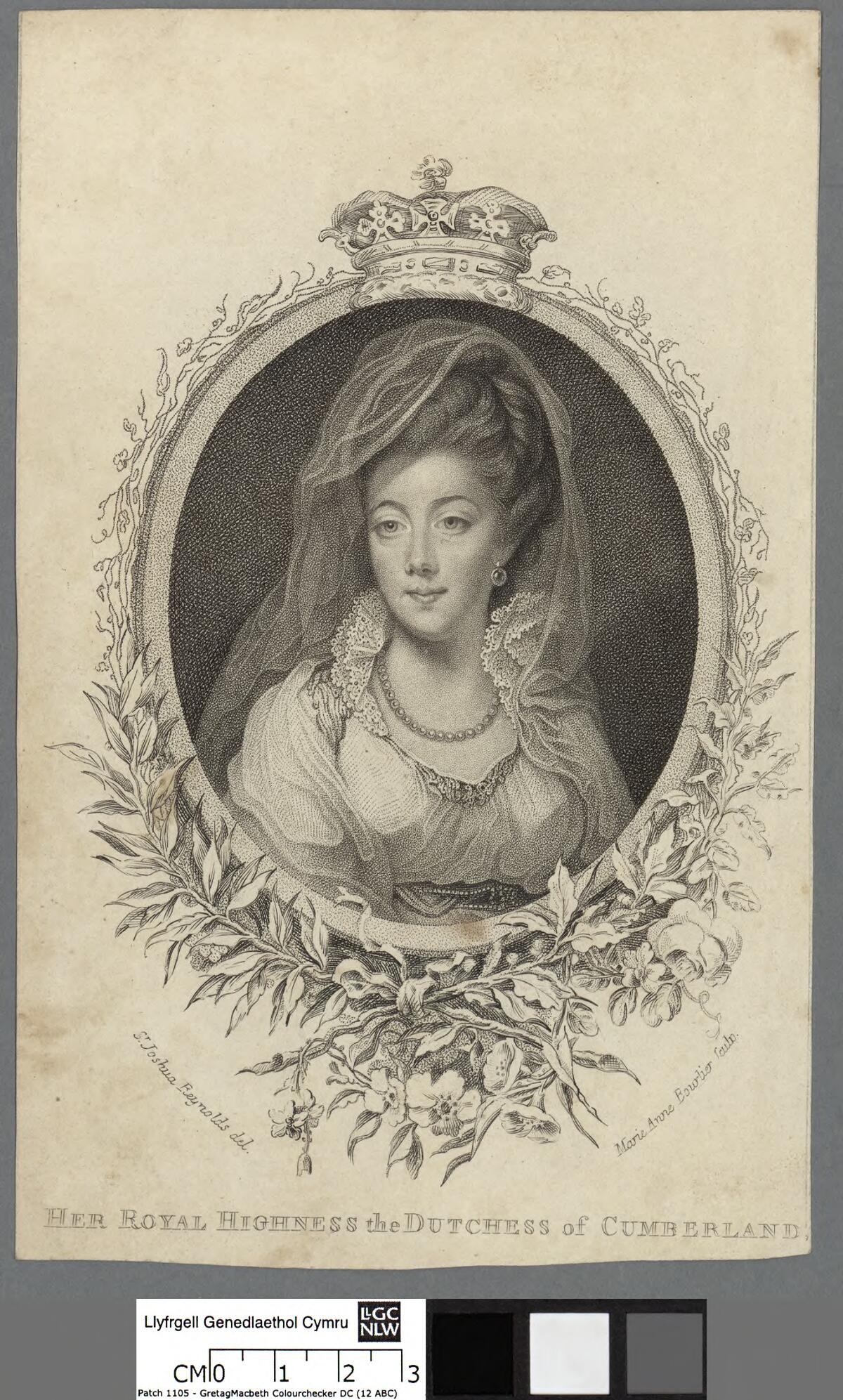
Portrait of Anne (née Horton), Duchess of Cumberland and Strathearn, c. 1800–12.

== Countesses of Cumberland (England, 1525-1643) ==
Subsidiary title: Baroness de Clifford.

Countess	Image	Earl	Tenure
Margaret Talbot		1st	Unknown-1516
Margaret Percy		1st	Unknown-1540
Eleanor Brandon		2nd	1542-1547
Anne Dacre		2nd	c.1558-1570
Margaret Russell		3rd	1577-1605
Grishold Hughes		4th	1605-Unknown
Frances Cecil		5th	1641-1643

== Duchesses of Cumberland (England, 1689–1702) ==
Subsidiary titles: Countess of Kendal, Baroness Okingham.

Duchess	Portrait	Birth	Marriage(s)	Death
Anne of England; House of Stuart; 1689–1702	Anne Stuart	6 February 1665; St James's Palace, Westminster – daughter of James, Duke of York and Anne Hyde	28 July 1683; Prince George of Denmark; 5 children	1 August 1714 aged 49

== Duchesses of Cumberland & Strathearn (Great Britain, 1766–1790) ==
Subsidiary titles: Countess of Dublin

Duchess	Portrait	Birth	Marriage(s)	Death
Anne Horton; Luttrell family 1771–1790	Anne Luttrell	24 January 1743; Marylebone, London – daughter of Simon Luttrell and Judith Lawes.	2 October 1771; Prince Henry Frederick; No children	28 December 1808 aged 49

== Duchesses of Cumberland & Teviotdale (Great Britain, 1799–1919) ==
Other titles: Queen of Hanover, Countess of Armagh

Duchess	Portrait	Birth	Marriage(s)	Death
Frederica of Mecklenburg-Strelitz; House of Mecklenburg-Strelitz; 1815–1841	Frederica	3 March 1778; Hanover – daughter of Grand Duke Charles II and Princess Friederike of Hesse-Darmstadt	29 August 1815; The Prince Ernest Augustus; 1 child	29 June 1841 aged 63
Marie of Saxe-Altenburg; House of Saxe-Altenburg; 1851–1878	Marie	14 April 1818; Hildburghausen, Saxe-Hildburghausen – daughter of Duke Joseph and Duchess Amelia of Württemberg	18 February 1843; George, Crown Prince of Hanover; 3 children	9 January 1907 aged 88
Princess Thyra of Denmark; House of Glücksburg; 1878–1919	Thyra	29 September 1853; Yellow Mansion, Copenhagen – daughter of King Christian IX and Louise of Hesse-Kassel	21 December 1878; Prince Ernest Augustus; 6 children	26 February 1933 aged 79
