= Augustus, Duke of Saxe-Lauenburg =

Augustus
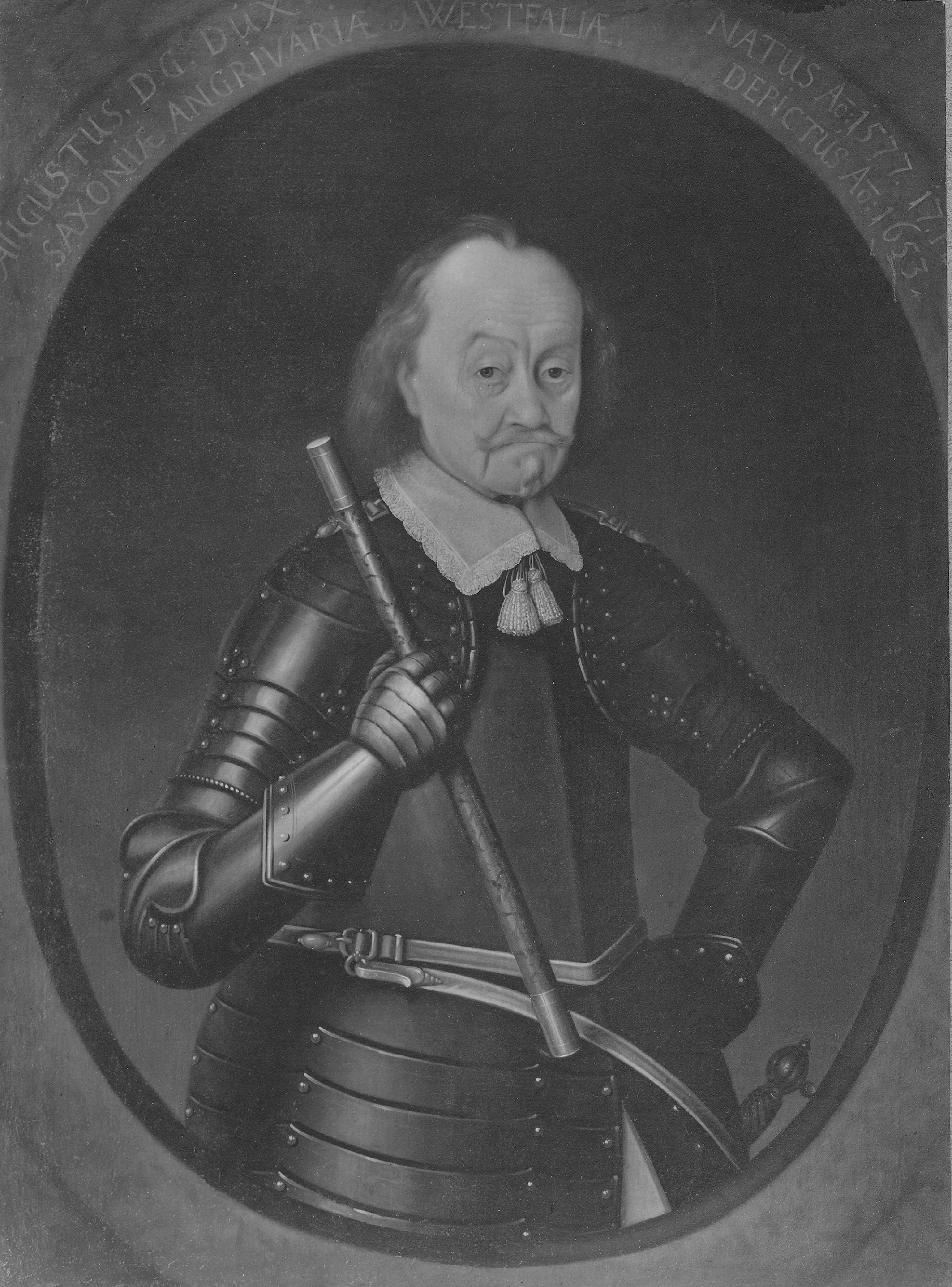

Duke of Saxe-Lauenburg
- Reign: 1619 – 1656
- Predecessor: Francis II
- Successor: Julius Henry
- Born: 17 February 1577; Ratzeburg
- Died: 18 January 1656 (aged 78); Lauenburg upon Elbe
- Spouse: Elisabeth Sophia of Holstein-Gottorp; Catherine of Oldenburg
- Issue more...: Anna Elisabeth
- House: House of Ascania
- Father: Francis II
- Mother: Margaret of Pomerania-Wolgast
- Religion: Lutheran

Augustus of Saxe-Lauenburg (Ratzeburg, 17 February 1577 – 18 January 1656, Lauenburg upon Elbe) was Duke of Saxe-Lauenburg between 1619 and 1656. He was a son of Duke Francis II and his first wife Margaret of Pomerania-Wolgast, daughter of Philip I, Duke of Pomerania-Wolgast. Since Augustus survived all his sons he was succeeded by his half-brother Julius Henry.

On his ascension Augustus moved Saxe-Lauenburg's capital from Neuhaus, whereto Francis II had moved it after the residential castle in Lauenburg upon Elbe (started in 1180–1182 by Bernhard, Count of Anhalt) had burnt down in 1616, towards Ratzeburg, where it remained since.

During the Thirty Years' War Augustus always remained neutral, however, billeting and alimenting foreign troops marching through posed a heavy burden onto the ducal subjects.

== Marriages and issue ==
Augustus married twice. On 5 March 1621 he married in Husum Elisabeth Sofie of Holstein-Gottorp (12 December 1599 – 25 November 1627), daughter of John Adolf, Duke of Holstein-Gottorp.

On 4 June 1633 he married, as his second wife, Catherine of Oldenburg (20 September 1582 – 29 February 1644), daughter of John VII, Count of Oldenburg. This marriage remained without children.

His children with Elisabeth Sophia of Holstein-Gottorp were the following:

- Sophia Margaretha (Ratzeburg, 6 August 1622 – 6 March 1637)
- Francis Augustus (4 July 1623 – 19 April 1625)
- Anna Elisabeth (23 August 1624 – 27 May 1688, Philippseck Castle in today's Butzbach), married on 2 April 1665 in Lübeck, divorced in 1672, William Christoph, Landgrave of Hesse-Homburg
- Sibylle Hedwig (30 July 1625 – 1 August 1703, Ratzeburg), married in 1654 her half-cousin Francis Erdmann, Duke of Saxe-Lauenburg
- John Adolphus (22 October 1626 – 23 April 1646, Ratzeburg)
- Philip Frederick (11 November 1627 – 16 November 1627)

== Notes ==
Augustus, Duke of Saxe-Lauenburg House of Ascania Born: 17 February 1577 in Ratzeburg Died: 18 January 1656 in Lauenburg upon Elbe
Regnal titles
Preceded by Francis II	Duke of Saxe-Lauenburg; 1619–1656	Succeeded by Julius Henry
