= Sophie Eleonore of Hesse-Darmstadt =

Sophia Eleonore of Hesse-Darmstadt
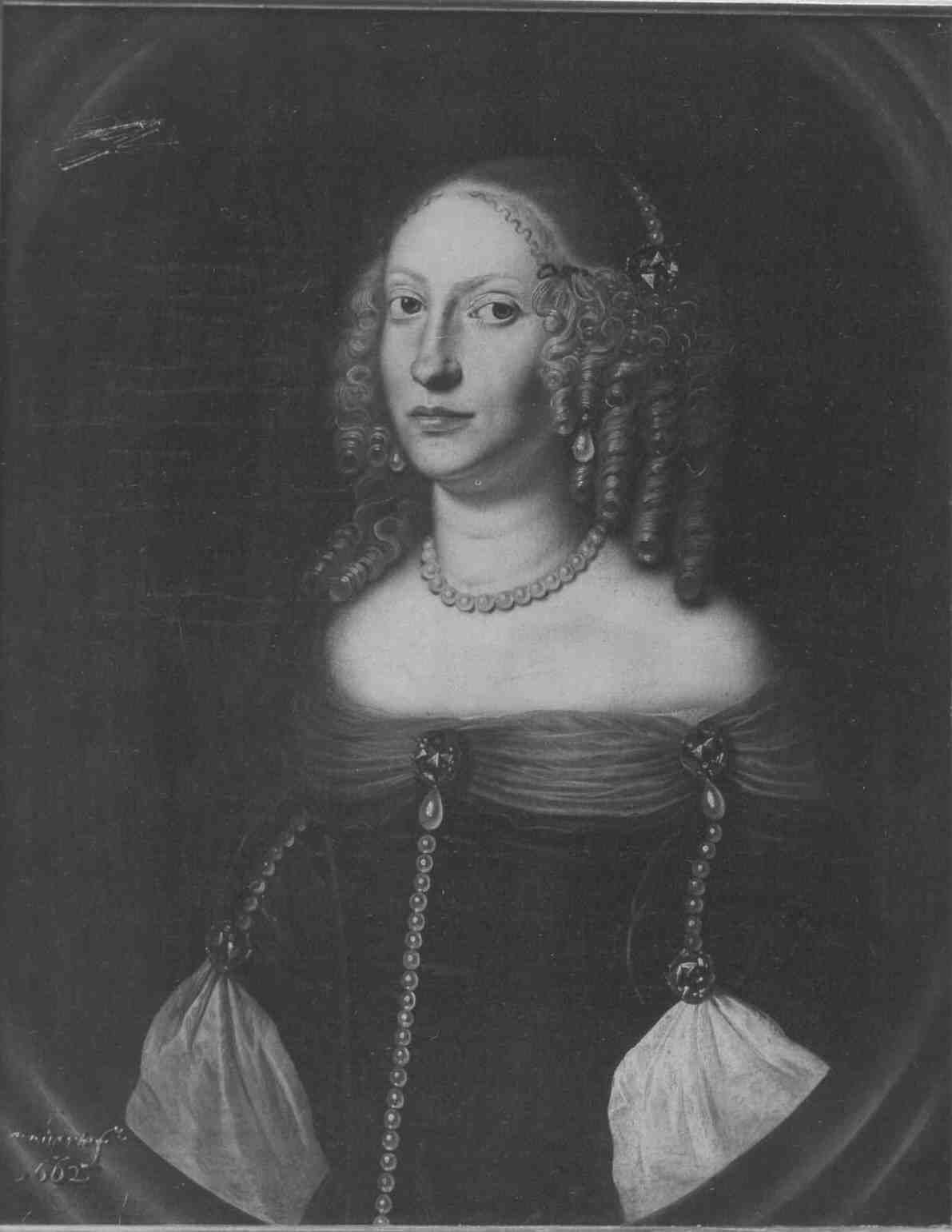
- Born: 7 January 1634; Darmstadt
- Died: 7 October 1663 (aged 29); Bingenheim, now part of Echzell
- Spouse: William Christoph, Landgrave of Hesse-Homburg (m. 1650)
- Issue: Christine Wilhelmine, Duchess of Mecklenburg-Grabow; Leopold George, Hereditary Prince of Hesse-Homburg
- House: House of Hesse
- Father: George II, Landgrave of Hesse-Darmstadt
- Mother: Sophia Eleonore of Saxony

Sophia Eleonore of Hesse-Darmstadt (7 January 1634 in Darmstadt – 7 October 1663 in Bingenheim, now part of Echzell), was a Landgravine of Hesse-Darmstadt by birth and a Landgravine of Hesse-Homburg by marriage.

She was a daughter of Landgrave George II of Hesse-Darmstadt (1605–1661) from his marriage to Sophia Eleonore (1609–1671), a daughter of Elector John George I of Saxony.

== Life ==
In Darmstadt on 21 April 1650, Sophia Eleonore was married to her cousin, Landgrave William Christoph of Hesse-Homburg (1625–1681). On the occasion of her wedding, her father gave her the district of Castle Bingenheim. William Christoph preferred Bingenheim to his castle in Homburg, so the family mostly lived in Bingenheim, and William Christoph was sometimes called the Landgrave of Hesse-Bingenheim. Her father had promised that her male descendants would be allowed to keep Bingenheim after her death; however, only two daughters survived their father. This led to a dispute between Hesse-Darmstadt and Hesse-Homburg about the ownership of Bingenheim, which was finally settled by Elisabeth Dorothea, who was acting as regent of Hesse-Darmstadt.

Sophia Eleonore died in Bingenheim following complications in her last childbirth, aged just 29. She had been constantly pregnant during her marriage, giving birth almost once a year, but almost all of her children went on to die in early childhood.

== Issue ==
Sophia Eleonore gave birth to 12 children in just 13 years, but only three of them survived infancy:

- Frederick, Hereditary Landgrave of Hesse-Homburg (Darmstadt, 12 March 1651 – Homburg v.d.Höhe, 27 July 1651).
- Christine Wilhelmine (Bingenheim, 30 June 1653 – Grabow, 16 May 1722), married Frederick, Duke of Mecklenburg-Grabow.
- Leopold George, Hereditary Landgrave of Hesse-Homburg (Bingenheim, 25 October 1654 – Schloss Gravenstein, Schleswig-Holstein, 26 February 1675), died unmarried.
- Frederick (Bingenheim, 5 September 1655 – Bingenheim, 6 September 1655).
- William (Bingenheim, 13 August 1656 – Bingenheim, 4 September 1656).
- Stillborn son (23 June 1657).
- Charles William (Bingenheim, 6 May 1658 – Bingenheim, 13 December 1658).
- Philipp (Bingenheim, 20 June 1659 – Bingenheim, 6 October 1659).
- Magdalene Sophie (Bingenheim, 24 April 1660 – Braunfels, 22 March 1720), married William Maurice, Count of Solms-Braunfels; among their children: Christine Charlotte of Solms-Braunfels and Frederick William, Prince of Solms-Braunfels.
- Stillborn son (7 June 1661).
- Frederick William (Bingenheim, 29 November 1662 – Homburg, 5 March 1663).
- Stillborn son (7 October 1663).
