= Leopold George, Hereditary Prince of Hesse-Homburg =

Leopold George,
- Hereditary Prince of Hesse-Homburg
- Born: 25 October 1654; Bingenheim
- Died: 26 February 1675 (aged 20); Schloss Gravenstein, Schleswig-Holstein
- House: House of Hesse
- Father: William Christoph, Landgrave of Hesse-Homburg
- Mother: Sophia Eleonore of Hesse-Darmstadt

Leopold George, Hereditary Prince of Hesse-Homburg (25 October 1654 in Bingenheim – 26 February 1675 in Schleswig-Holstein), was a German nobleman and the heir apparent to the Landgraviate of Hesse-Homburg from his birth. After his father, William Christoph, sold most of Homburg to his younger brother George Christian in 1669, Leopold George became Hereditary Prince of Hesse-Homburg-Bingenheim.

He predeceased his father by 6 years, meaning that he never became Landgrave himself. Leopold George never married, and had no legitimate issue.
