= William Christoph, Landgrave of Hesse-Homburg =

William Christoph
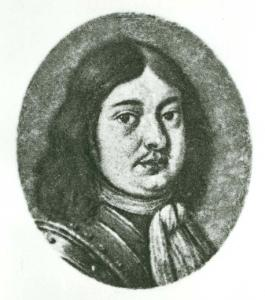
- William Christoph, Landgrave of Hesse-Homburg

Landgrave of Hesse-Homburg
- Reign: 1643-1669

Landgrave of Hesse-Homburg-Bingenheim
- Reign: 1669-1681
- Born: 13 November 1625; Ober-Rosbach
- Died: 27 August 1681 (aged 55); Bingenheim
- Spouse: Sophia Eleonore of Hesse-Darmstadt (m. 1650; died 1663) Anna Elisabeth of Saxe-Lauenburg (m. 1665; div. 1672)
- Father: Frederick I, Landgrave of Hesse-Homburg
- Mother: Margaret Elisabeth of Leiningen-Westerburg

William Christoph of Hesse-Homburg (13 November 1625, Ober-Rosbach – 27 August 1681, then in Bingenheim, now in Echzell) was the second Landgrave of Hesse-Homburg (then known as "Landgrave of Bingenheim") from 1648 to 1669.

He was the third but second surviving of five sons of Frederick I, Landgrave of Hesse-Homburg and succeeded his brother Ludwig I as Landgrave in 1643, but his mother was his regent until 1648.

== Life ==
In 1669, he sold Homburg to his younger brother George Christian but retained Bingenheim (Landgrave of Hesse-Homburg-Bingenheim). George Christian died without heirs, and their youngest brother succeeded as Frederick II, Landgrave of Hesse-Homburg.

In Darmstadt on 21 April 1650, William Christoph married firstly Princess Sophia Eleonore, a daughter of George II, Landgrave of Hesse-Darmstadt. George II was his first cousin, as both were grandsons of George I, Landgrave of Hesse-Darmstadt. They had 12 children of which only three survived infancy:

- Frederick, Hereditary Landgrave of Hesse-Homburg (Darmstadt, 12 March 1651 - Homburg v.d.Höhe, 27 July 1651). Died in infancy
- Christine Wilhelmine (Bingenheim, 30 June 1653 – Grabow, 16 May 1722), married Frederick, Duke of Mecklenburg-Grabow.
- Leopold George, Hereditary Landgrave of Hesse-Homburg (Bingenheim, 25 October 1654 – Schloss Gravenstein, Schleswig-Holstein, 26 February 1675), died unmarried.
- Frederick (Bingenheim, 5 September 1655 - Bingenheim, 6 September 1655). Died in infancy
- William (Bingenheim, 13 August 1656 - Bingenheim, 4 September 1656). Died in infancy
- Stillborn son (23 June 1657).
- Charles William (Bingenheim, 6 May 1658 - Bingenheim, 13 December 1658). Died in infancy
- Philipp (Bingenheim, 20 June 1659 - Bingenheim, 6 October 1659). Died in infancy
- Magdalene Sophie (Bingenheim, 24 April 1660 – Braunfels, 22 March 1720), married William Maurice, Count of Solms-Braunfels; among their children: Christine Charlotte of Solms-Braunfels and Frederick William, Prince of Solms-Braunfels.
- Stillborn son (7 June 1661).
- Frederick William (Bingenheim, 29 November 1662 - Homburg, 5 March 1663). Died in infancy
- Stillborn son (7 October 1663).

In Lübeck on 2 April 1665, William Christoph married secondly Princess Anna Elisabeth of Saxe-Lauenburg, a daughter of Duke Augustus of Saxe-Lauenburg. They were divorced in 1672, and Anna Elisabeth retired to and later died in Philippseck Castle in today's Butzbach.

William Christoph, Landgrave of Hesse-Homburg House of Hesse Born: 13 November 1625 Died: 27 August 1681
Preceded by Frederick I	Landgrave of Hesse-Homburg; 1648-1669	Succeeded by George Christian
