= Princess Ulrike Louise of Solms-Braunfels =

Landgravine of Hesse-Homburg (1731–1792)

Ulrike Louise of Solms-Braunfels
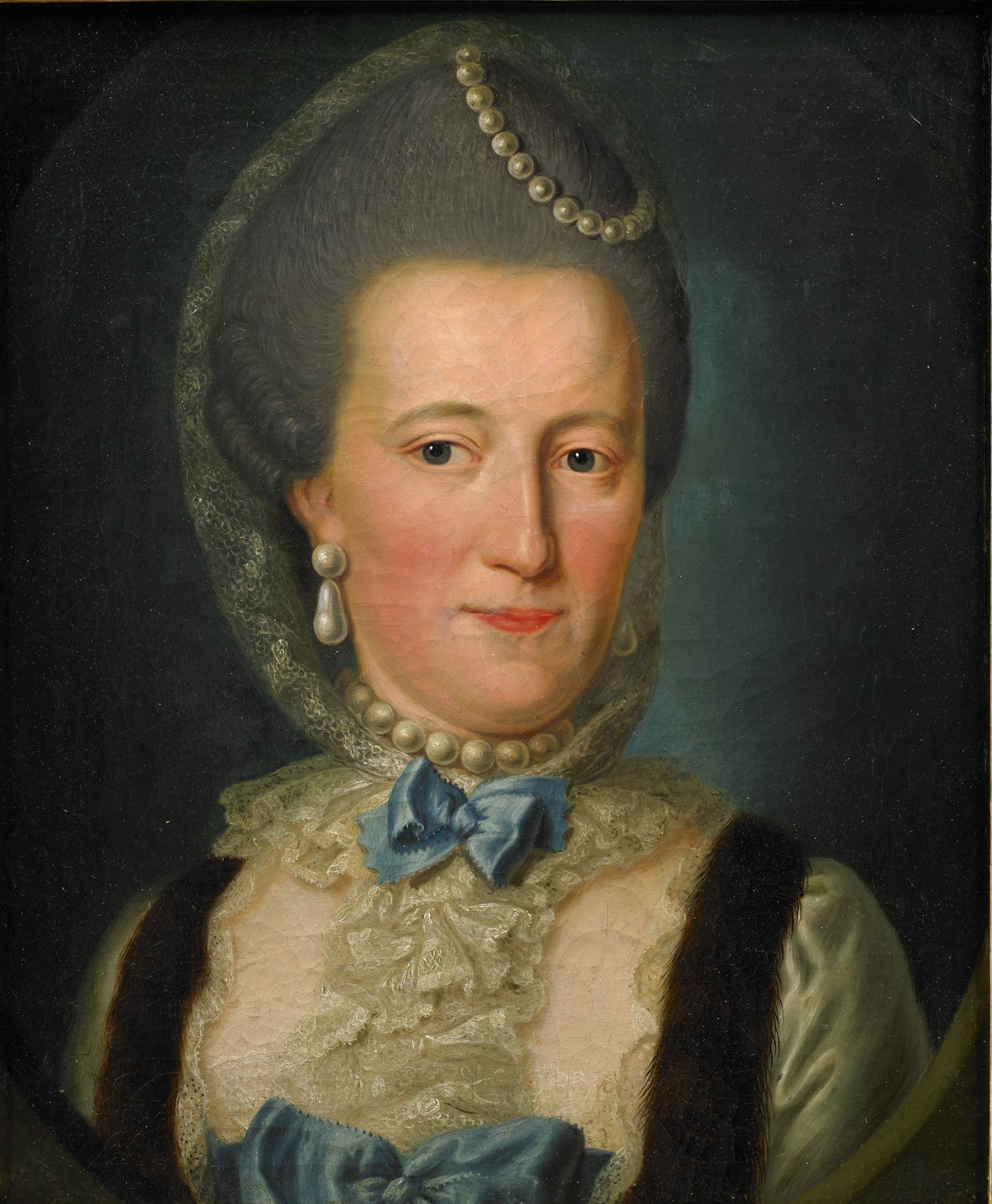
- Portrait c. 1760

Landgravine consort of Hesse-Homburg
- Tenure: 10 October 1746 – 7 February 1751
- Born: 1 May 1731; Hungen
- Died: 12 September 1792 (aged 61); Bad Homburg
- Spouse: Frederick IV, Landgrave of Hesse-Homburg
- Issue: Frederick V, Landgrave of Hesse-Homburg
- House: Solms-Braunfels
- Father: Frederick William, Prince of Solms-Braunfels
- Mother: Sophie Magdalene of Solms-Laubach

Princess Ulrike Louise of Solms-Braunfels (1 May 1731 in Hungen, Landgraviate of Hesse-Darmstadt – 12 September 1792 in Bad Homburg) was a German regent, Landgravine of Hesse-Homburg by marriage to Frederick IV of Hesse-Homburg, and regent of Hesse-Homburg, on behalf of her minor son Frederick V Louis William Christian from 1751 to 1766.

== Biography ==
Ulrike Louise was a daughter of Prince Frederick William of Solms-Braunfels (1696–1761) and his second wife, Countess Sophie Magdalene of Solms-Laubach-Utphe (1701–1744), daughter of Count Otto of Solms-Laubach-Utphe (1673-1743) and Countess Luise Albertine of Schönburg-Waldenburg (1686-1740).

She married on 10 October 1746 in Hungen her cousin, Landgrave Frederick IV of Hesse-Homburg (1724–1751). Shortly after the wedding, troops from Hesse-Darmstadt marched into Hesse-Homburg and occupied it and city of Bad Homburg with Homburg Castle. The dispute could be arbitrated, and Frederick IV was reinstated as ruling Landgrave.

After her husband died in 1751, she took up government, with imperial permission, together with Landgrave Louis VIII of Hesse-Darmstadt, for her son Frederick V, who was only three years old when his father died. She managed to preserve the sovereignty of Hesse-Homburg and marry her son to a daughter of Landgrave Louis IX of Hesse-Darmstadt.

== Issue ==
From her marriage with Frederick IV, Ulrike Louise had two children:

- Frederick V Louis William Christian (Homburg, 30 January 1748 – Homburg, 20 January 1820), Landgrave of Hesse-Homburg.
- Marie Christine Charlotte Wilhelmine (Homburg, 4 November 1749 – Homburg, 10 November 1750).
