= Johann Stephan Pütter =

German law lecturer and publicist (1725–1807)

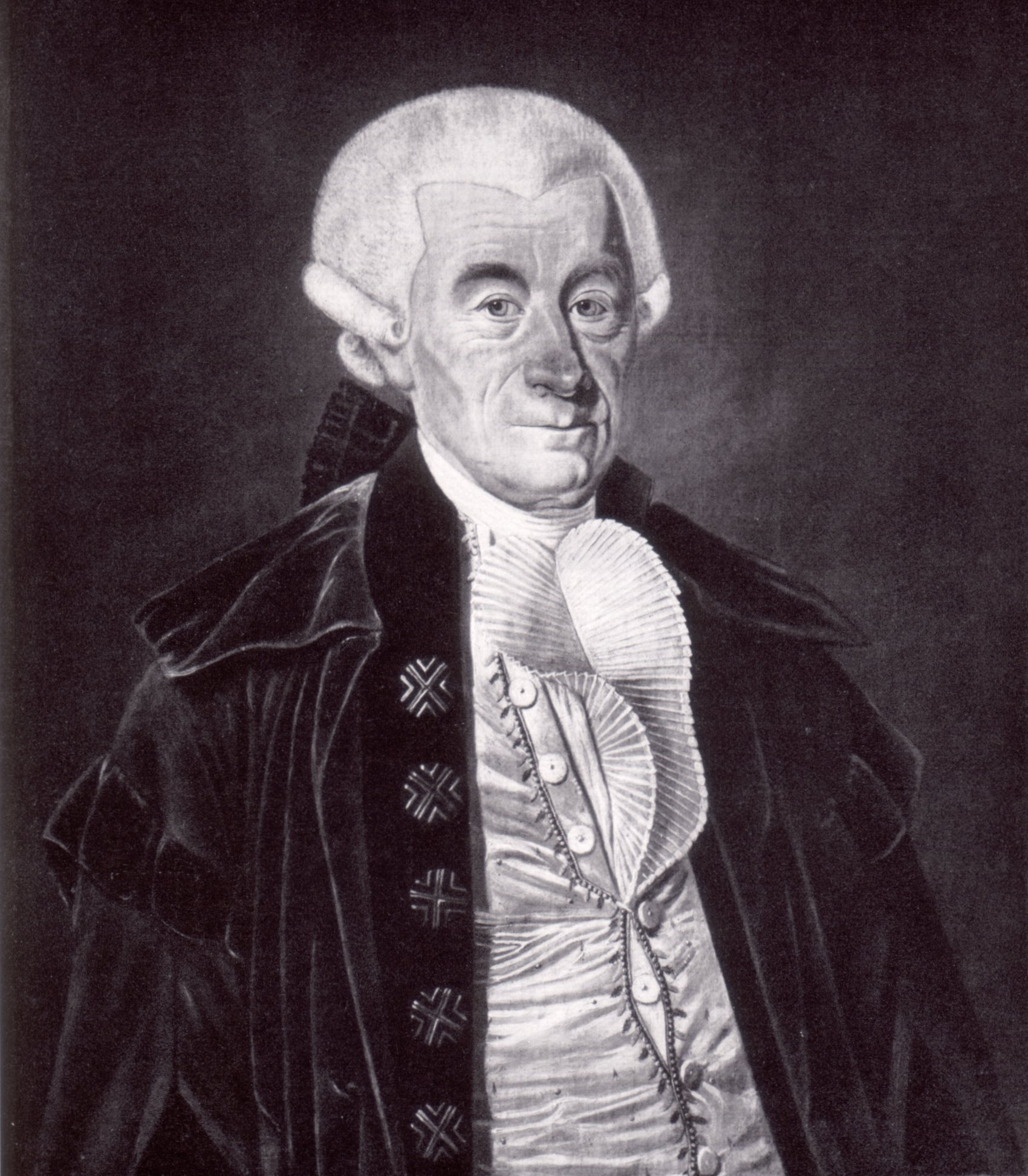
- Portrait of Johann Stephan Pütter by Carl Lafontaine
- Born: 25 June 1725; Iserlohn, Holy Roman Empire
- Died: 12 August 1807 (aged 82); Göttingen, Nether saxony, Germany
- Occupations: Law lecturer and publicist

Johann Stephan Pütter (25 June 1725, Iserlohn – 12 August 1807, Göttingen) was a German law lecturer and publicist. He was professor of law at the university of Göttingen from 1746 until his death. He exerted great influence on the law institutions of his time. His principal work is Historische Entwicklung der heutigen Staatsverfassung des Deutschen Reichs (Historical development of the current constitution of the German Empire; 1786–'99).

== Life ==
Johann Stephan Pütter was born to a merchant from Iserlohn, with his mother coming from the Varnhagen family of pastors from the same town. He received his only pre-university education at home from a local priest, learning Latin, ancient Greek, Hebrew, Chaldaean and Syriac and so almost becoming an orientalist. Instead, however, on his father's death, he followed family tradition and went into law.

Pütter began his legal studies aged nearly 13 at the University of Marburg under tutors who included Christian Wolff. In 1739 he joined the University of Halle, where he became friends with Gottfried Achenwall, and completed his legal studies at the University of Jena. In 1744 he habilitated at Marburg and in 1746 he was appointed associate professor of law at University of Göttingen, where he remained until his death, not least thanks to the advocacy and protection of David Georg Strube. This was despite many requests from other universities – he even turned down offers to become a minister in the electorate of Hanover, a member of the 'Reichshofrat' in Vienna or a law-reformer in St Petersburg. However, he did serve three times (1764, 1790 and 1794) as the electorate of Hanover's representative at the Imperial elections in Frankfurt (Hanover then being in personal union with the king of England).

According to Achenwall, Pütter was established in 1743 as a member of the Masonic lodge named "Zu den drey Löwen" in Marburg.

The Pütterstraße in Iserlohn's city centre is named after him.

== Work ==
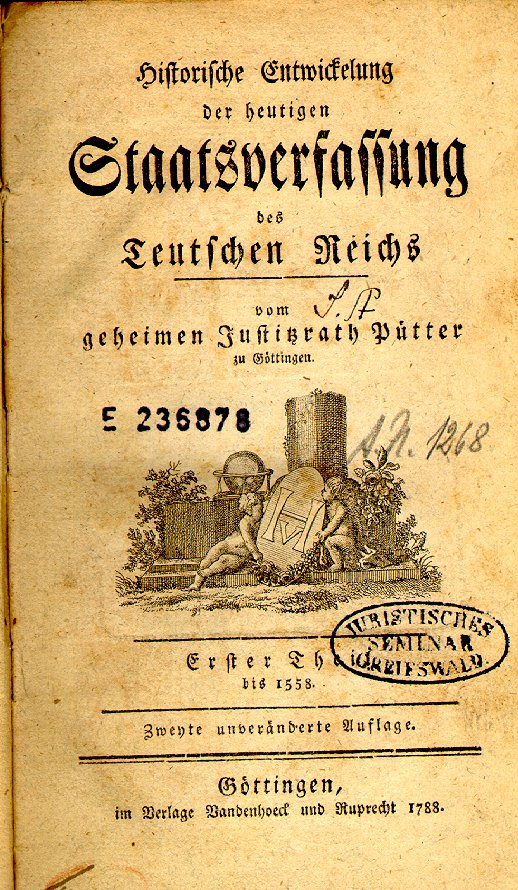
Title page of Historische Entwicklung der heutigen Staatsverfassung

== Books ==
- „Vollständiges Handbuch der deutschen Reichshistorie“, Göttingen, 1762, (2. Aufl. 1772).
- „Litteratur des teutschen Staatsrechts“, Göttingen, 1776–1783, (3 volumes) online version.
- „Historische Entwickelung der heutigen Staatsverfassung des Deutschen Reichs“, Göttingen, 1786–87, (3 Bde.), (3. Aufl. 1798).
- Doktor-Dissertation des Johann Stephan Pütter, vorgelegt am 16. April 1744. Marburg, Müller o.J.
- Vorbereitung zu einem praktischen Kollegium des Öffentlichen Rechts. Göttingen, J.W. Schmid 1749.
- Anleitung zur juristischen Praxi ... Göttingen, Vandenhoeck 1753.
- Grundriß der Staatsveränderungen des teutschen Reichs. Göttingen, Vandenhoeck 1755.
- Historisch-politisches Handbuch von den besonderen teutschen Staaten, erster Theil: Oesterreich, Bayern und Pfalz. Göttingen, Vandenhoeck 1758.
- Elementa Iuris Publici Germanici. Göttingen 1760.
- Auserlesene Rechts-Fälle aus allen Theilen der in Teutschland üblichen Rechtsgelehrsamkeit in Deductionen, rechtlichen Bedenken, Relationen und Urteilen. 3 Bde. Göttingen, Vandenhoeck 1760–1785.
- Öffentliche Rede zur Feier des allgemeinen Friedens am 19. September in der Universitätskirche.Göttingen 1763.
- Versuch einer academischen Gelehrtengeschichte von der Georg-Augustus-Universität zu Göttingen. Göttingen, Vandenhoeck 1765.
- Opuscula rem judiciariam Imperii illustrantia. Göttingen, Vandenhoeck 1766.
- Neuer Versuch einer juristischen Encyclopädie und Methodologie. Göttingen, Vandenhoeck 1767.
- Tabulae Genealogicae ad illustrandam Historiam Imperii Germaniamque Principem. 2 Bde. Göttingen, Vandenhoeck 1768–1788.
- Rechtliches Bedenken in Sachen der Bürgerschaft zu Rostock ... Göttingen, Vandenhoeck 1769.
- Unparteyisches rechtliches Bedenken über die zwischen der Krone Böhmens und den Herren von Zedwitz ... Göttingen, J. Ch. Dieterich 1772.
- Der einzige Weg zur wahren Glückseligkeit deren jeder Mensch fähig ist. Göttingen, Dieterich 1775.
- Wahre Bewandtnis der am 8. May 1776 erfolgten Trennung der bisherigen Visitation des kayserlichen und Reichs-Cammergerichts. Göttingen, Vandenhoeck 1776.
- Neuester Reichsschluß über einige Verbesserungen des Kaiserlichen und Reichs-Kammergerichts ... Göttingen, Vandenhoeck 1776.
- Beyträge zum Teutschen Staats- und Fürstenrechte. Göttingen, Vandenhoeck 1777.
- Teutsche Reichgeschichte in ihrem Hauptfaden entwickelt. Göttingen, Vandenhoeck 1778.
- Primae Lineae Juris Privati Principum Speciatim Germaniae. Göttingen, Vandenhoeck 1779.
- Kurzer Begriff der teutschen Reichsgeschichte. Göttingen, Vandenhoeck 1780.
- Nova Epitome Processus Imperii. Göttingen, Vandenhoeck 1786.
- Historische Entwicklung der heutigen Staatsverfassung des teutschen Reichs. 3 Bde. Göttingen, Vandenhoeck 1786–1787.
- Unmaßgebliche Gedanken über die von der Osnabrückischen Stadt Fürstenau wegen der daselbst gestatteten catholischen Religionsübung geführten Beschwerde. Göttingen, Vandenhoeck 1788.
- Erörterungen und Beispiele des teutschen Staats- und Fürstenrechts. 2 Bde. Göttingen, Vandenhoeck 1793–1794.
- Über das gemeine Reichs- oder fürstlich Taxische Postwesen gegen den Herrn geheimen Justizrath Pütter in Göttingen. Hildburghausen, J.G. Hanisch 1793.
- Synopsis Historiae Imperii Romano-Germanici. Göttingen, Vandenhoeck 1793.
- Über den Unterschied der Stände ... Göttingen, Vandenhoeck 1795.
- Ueber Mißheiraten Teutscher Fürsten und Grafen. Göttingen, Vandenhoeck 1796.
- Geist des Westphälischen Friedens ... Göttingen, Vandenhoeck 1795.
- Ueber die beste Art Acten zu referiren ... Göttingen, P.G. Schröder 1797.
- Selbstbiographie zur dankbaren Jubelfeier seiner 50jährigen Professorstelle zu Göttingen. 2 Bde. Göttingen, Vandenhoeck 1798.
