= Echzell =

- Municipality
- Coat of arms

- Location of Echzell within Wetteraukreis district
- Interactive map of Echzell
- Location within Germany Location within Hesse
- Coordinates: 50°23′N 8°53′E
- Country: Germany
- State: Hesse
- Admin. region: Darmstadt
- District: Wetteraukreis
- Subdivisions: 5 districts

Government
  - Mayor (2019–25): Wilfried Mogk (Ind.)

Area
  - Total: 37.65 km^{2} (14.54 sq mi)
- Elevation: 144 m (472 ft)

Population (2025-12-31)
  - Total: 5,484
  - Density: 145.7/km^{2} (377.3/sq mi)
- Time zone: UTC+01:00 (CET)
  - Summer (DST): UTC+02:00 (CEST)
- Postal codes: 61209
- Dialling codes: 06008, 06035
- Vehicle registration: FB
- Website: www.echzell.de

Echzell (German pronunciation: [ˈɛçtsɛl]) is a municipality in the Wetteraukreis district, in the Hesse state of Germany. It is located approximately 35 kilometers northeast of Frankfurt am Main.
