= Frederick William, Prince of Solms-Braunfels =

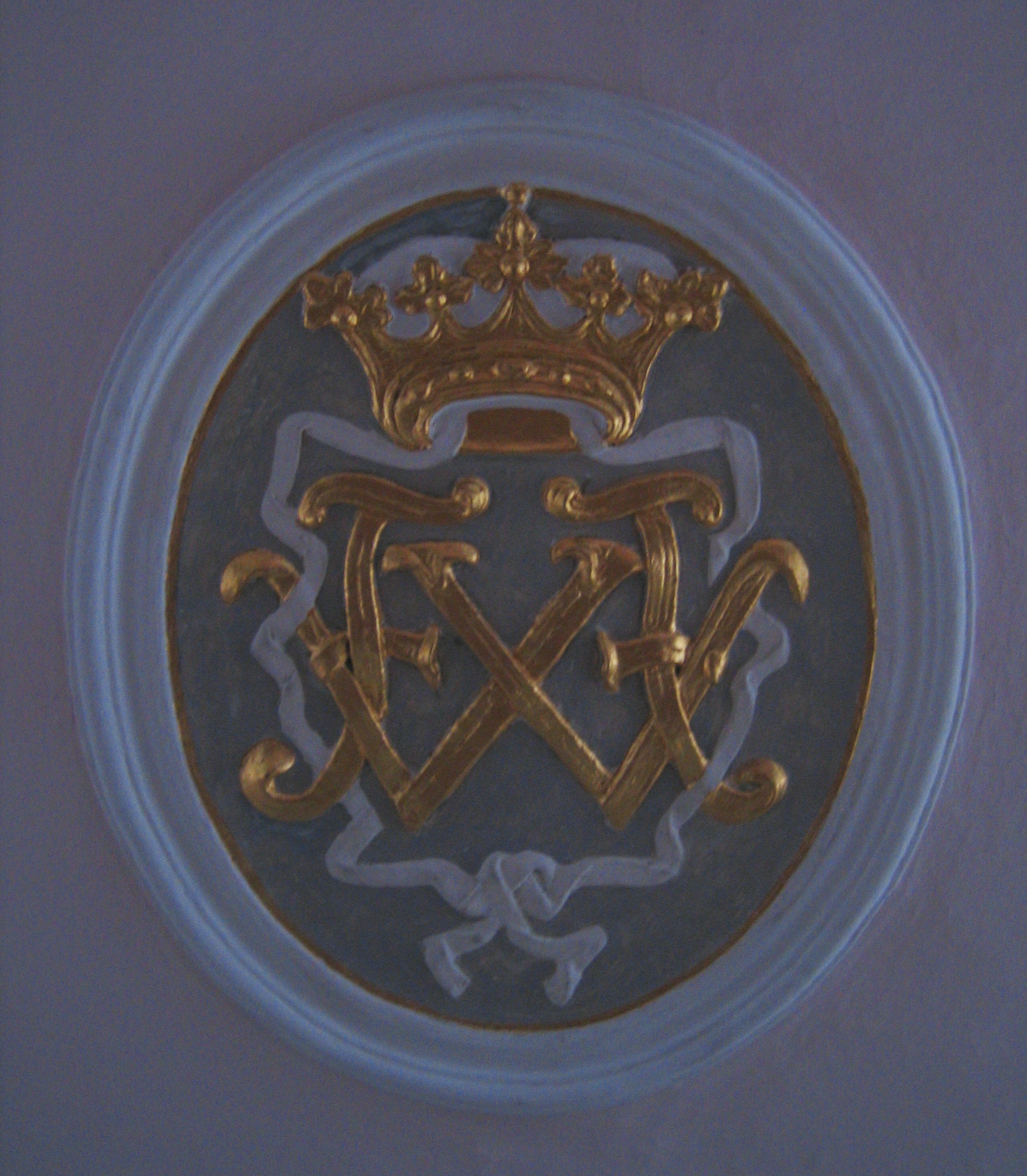
- Monogram of Frederick William in the Evangelical Reformed Church in Wölfersheim
- Born: 11 January 1696; Braunfels
- Died: 24 February 1761 (aged 65); Braunfels
- Spouse: Magdalena Henrietta of Nassau-Weilburg; Sophia Magdalena Benigna of Solms-Laubach-Utphe; Charlotte Catherine of Birkenfeld-Gelnhausen
- Issue: Ferdinand, Prince of Solms-Braunfels; Ulrike Louise, Landgravine of Hesse-Homburg
- House: House of Solms-Braunfels
- Father: William Maurice of Solms-Braunfels
- Mother: Magdalene Sophie of Hesse-Homburg

Prince Frederick William of Solms-Braunfels (11 January 1696 in Braunfels – 24 February 1761, Braunfels) was the first Prince of Solms-Braunfels. He was the son of Count Wilhelm Moritz of Solms-Braunfels and Princess Magdalene Sophie of Hesse-Homburg, daughter of William Christoph, Landgrave of Hesse-Homburg, and his first wife Princess Sophia Eleonore of Hesse-Darmstadt.

== Life ==
Frederick William received an aristocratic education. When his father died on 18 February 1724, he became Count of Solms-Braunfels, Greifenstein and Hungen, Tecklenburg, Kriechingen and Lingen, Lord of Münzenberg, Wildenfels, Sonnewalde, Püttlingen, Dortweiler and Beaucourt. However, because of his poor health, he did not rule much personally. He did, however, succeed in his marriage policy, which allowed his children to marry into powerful families around the country.

Financial difficulties forced him to sell the city of Butzbach, which his family had owned since 1478, to Hesse-Darmstadt on 17 March 1741. On 22 May 1742, Emperor Charles VII raised the House of Solms-Braunfels to the rank of Imperial Prince.

When Friedrich Wilhelm died in 1761, he was succeeded by his son Ferdinand Wilhelm Ernst.

== Marriage and issue ==
He was married three times. His first wife was Princess Magdalena Henrietta of Nassau-Weilburg (1691-1725), daughter of John Ernst of Nassau-Weilburg. They had three children:

- Ferdinand, Prince of Solms-Braunfels (8 February 1721 – 2 October 1783), married Countess Sophie Christine Wilhelmine of Solms-Laubach (1741-1772)
- Magdalena Polyxena Maria Casimira (17 July 1722 – 17 November 1722)
- Charlotte Henriette Magdalene Wilhelmine (15 August 1725 – 29 April 1785)

On 9 May 1726, he married his second wife, Countess Sophia Magdalena Benigna of Solms-Utphe, daughter of Count Karl Otto of Solms-Laubach-Utphe-Tecklenburg and Countess Louise Albertine of Schönburg-Waldenburg. They had 11 children:

- Charles William Louis (14 June 1727 –14/15 December 1812)
- William Christopher (20 June 1732 – 8 December 1811)
- Rudolph Louis William (25 August 1733 – 2 January 1809)
- William Alexander (7 March 1736 – 12 March 1738)
- Anton Friedrich William (3 September 1739 – 7 February 1812)
- Elizabeth Marie Louise Benigna (5 August 1728 – 19 June 1795)
- Ulrike Louise (30 April 1731 – 12 September 1792), married on 10 October 1746 Frederick IV, Landgrave of Hesse-Homburg (1724–1751)
- Amalie Eleonore (22 November 1734 – 19 April 1811), married on 16 December 1765 Prince Charles Louis, Prince of Anhalt-Bernburg-Schaumburg-Hoym (1723–1806)
- Carolina Albertina (12 December 1740 – 26 February 1742)
- Magdalena Sophie (4 June 1742 – 21 January 1819), married on 22 April 1778 to Prince Victor Amadeus of Anhalt-Bernburg-Schaumburg-Hoym (1744-1790)
- Christine Friederike Charlotte (30 August 1744 – 16 December 1823), married on 26 March 1780 to Simon August, Count of Lippe-Detmold (1727–1782)

His third wife was the Countess Palatine Charlotte Catherine of Birkenfeld-Gelnhausen (1699–1785), daughter of John Charles, Count Palatine of Gelnhausen by his second wife, Esther Maria of Witzleben-Elgersburg. This marriage remained childless.
