= Solms-Braunfels =

County in Hesse, Germany

County (Principality) of Solms-Braunfels Grafschaft (Fürstentum) Solms-Braunfels
- 1258–1806
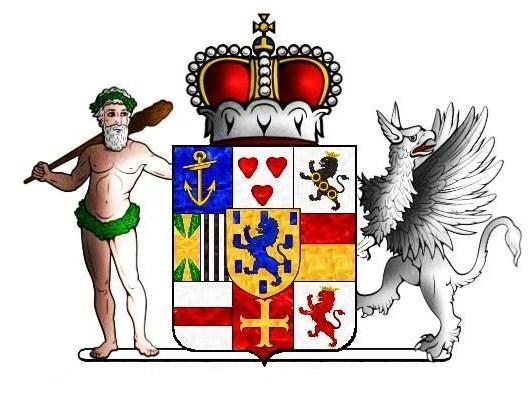
- Coat of arms
- Status: State of the Holy Roman Empire
- Capital: Braunfels
- Common languages: West Central German
- Government: Principality
- Historical era: Middle Ages
  - Partitioned from Solms: 1258
  - Partitioned to create Ottenstein: 1325
  - Partitioned to create Lich: 1409
  - Partitioned to create Greifenstein and Hungen: 1592
  - Raised to principality: 1742
  - Mediatised to Austria, Hesse, Prussia and Württemberg: 1806
Preceded by
County of Solms
Succeeded by
Archduchy of Austria
Grand Duchy of Hesse
Kingdom of Prussia
Kingdom of Württemberg

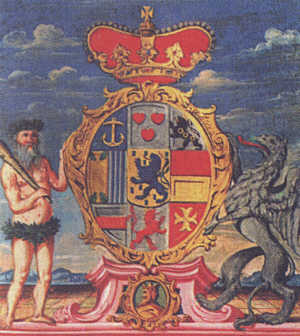
Solms-Braunfels coat of arms

Solms-Braunfels was a County and later Principality with Imperial immediacy in what is today the federal Land of Hesse in Germany.

== History ==
Solms-Braunfels was a partition of Solms, ruled by the House of Solms, and was raised to a Principality of the Holy Roman Empire in 1742. The county of Solms-Braunfels was partitioned between: itself and Solms-Ottenstein in 1325; itself and Solms-Lich in 1409; and itself, Solms-Greifenstein and Solms-Hungen in 1592.

Frederick William (1696–1761) was created a Prince of the Holy Roman Empire in 1742, with his younger offspring also bearing the title prince and princess, styled Serene Highness. The Principality of Solms-Braunfels was mediatised to Austria, Hesse-Darmstadt, Prussia and Württemberg in 1806.

== Rulers ==
=== Counts of Solms-Braunfels (1258–1742) ===
- Henry III, Count 1258–1312 (died 1312), elder son of Henry II, Count of Solms
  - Bernhard I, Count 1312–49 (died 1349), second son of Henry III
    - Otto I, Count 1349–1410 (died 1410)
      - Bernhard II, Count 1409–59 (died 1459)
        - Otto II, Count 1459–1504 (1426–1504)
          - Bernhard III, Count 1504–47 (1468–1547)
            - Philipp, Count 1547–81 (1494–1581)
              - Konrad, Count 1581–92 (1540–1592)
                - Johann Albrecht I, Count 1592–1623 (1563–1623); his third daughter was Amalia, wife of Frederick Henry, Prince of Orange
                  - Konrad Ludwig, Count 1623–35 (1595–1635)
                  - Johann Albrecht II, Count 1635–48 (1599–1647)
                    - Heinrich Trajectinus, Count 1648–93 (1639–1693)
                - Wilhelm I, Count of Solms-Greifenstein (1570–1635)
                  - Wilhelm II, Count of Solms-Greifenstein (1609–1676)
                    - Wilhelm Moritz, Count of Solms-Greifenstein 1676–1720, and of Solms-Braunfels 1693–1720 (1651–1720)
                      - Friedrich Wilhelm, Count 1720–42 (1696–1761), created Reichsfürst 1742

=== Princes of Solms-Braunfels (1742–1806) ===
- Friedrich Wilhelm, 1st Prince 1742–61 (1696–1761)
  - Ferdinand Wilhelm Ernst, 2nd Prince 1761–83 (1721–1783)
    - Wilhelm Christian Karl, 3rd Prince 1783–1837, mediatized 1806 (1759–1837)

=== Mediatized Princes of Solms-Braunfels ===
- Ferdinand Wilhelm Ernst, 2nd Prince of Solms-Braunfels 1761–83 (1721–1783)
  - Wilhelm Christian Karl, 3rd Prince 1783–1837, mediatized 1806 (1759–1837)
    - Friedrich Wilhelm Ferdinand, 4th Prince 1837–73 (1797–1873)
  - Prince Friedrich Wilhelm of Solms-Braunfels (1770–1814)
    - Prince Friedrich Wilhelm Heinrich of Solms-Braunfels (1801–1868)
      - Ernst Friedrich Wilhelm, 5th Prince 1873–80 (1835–1880)
      - Georg Friedrich Bernhard, 6th Prince 1880–91 (1836–1891)
        - Georg Friedrich Victor, 7th Prince 1891–1970 (1890–1970)

The main branch of the princely House of Solms-Braunfels became extinct with Georg Friedrich Victor in 1970. Braunfels and Hungen Castles including their agricultural and forest estates were inherited by the last Prince's daughter Maria Gabrielle Princess of Solms-Braunfels (1918−2003) and her husband Hans Georg Count von Oppersdorff (1920−2003). Since 1969, they and their offspring bear the name Count/Countess von Oppersdorff-Solms-Braunfels, with consent of the Hessian Ministry of the Interior.

An Austrian side branch (which had owned estates in Bohemia and Hungary until 1945) became extinct in 1989.

== Gallery ==
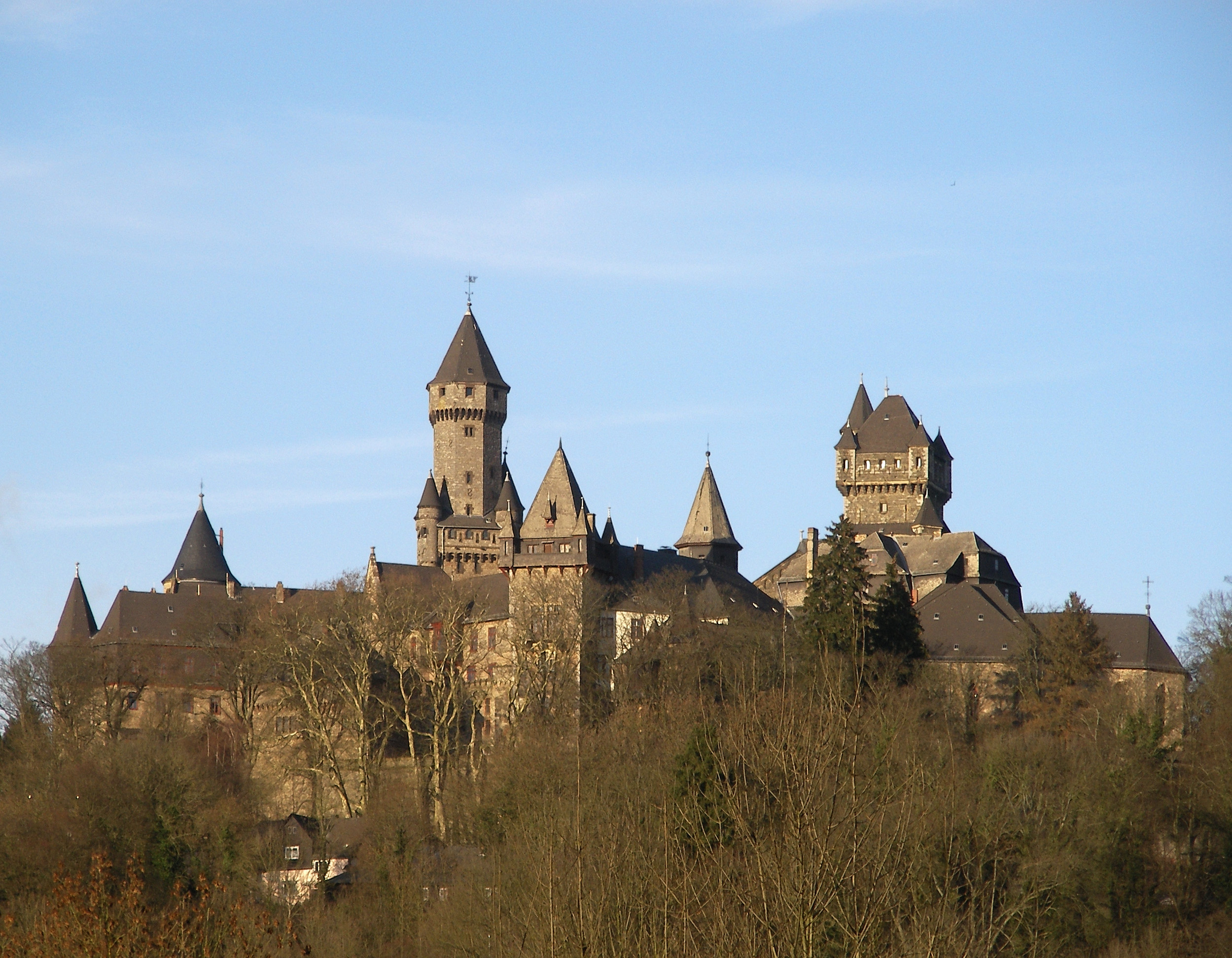
Braunfels Castle (owned by the family since 1260)

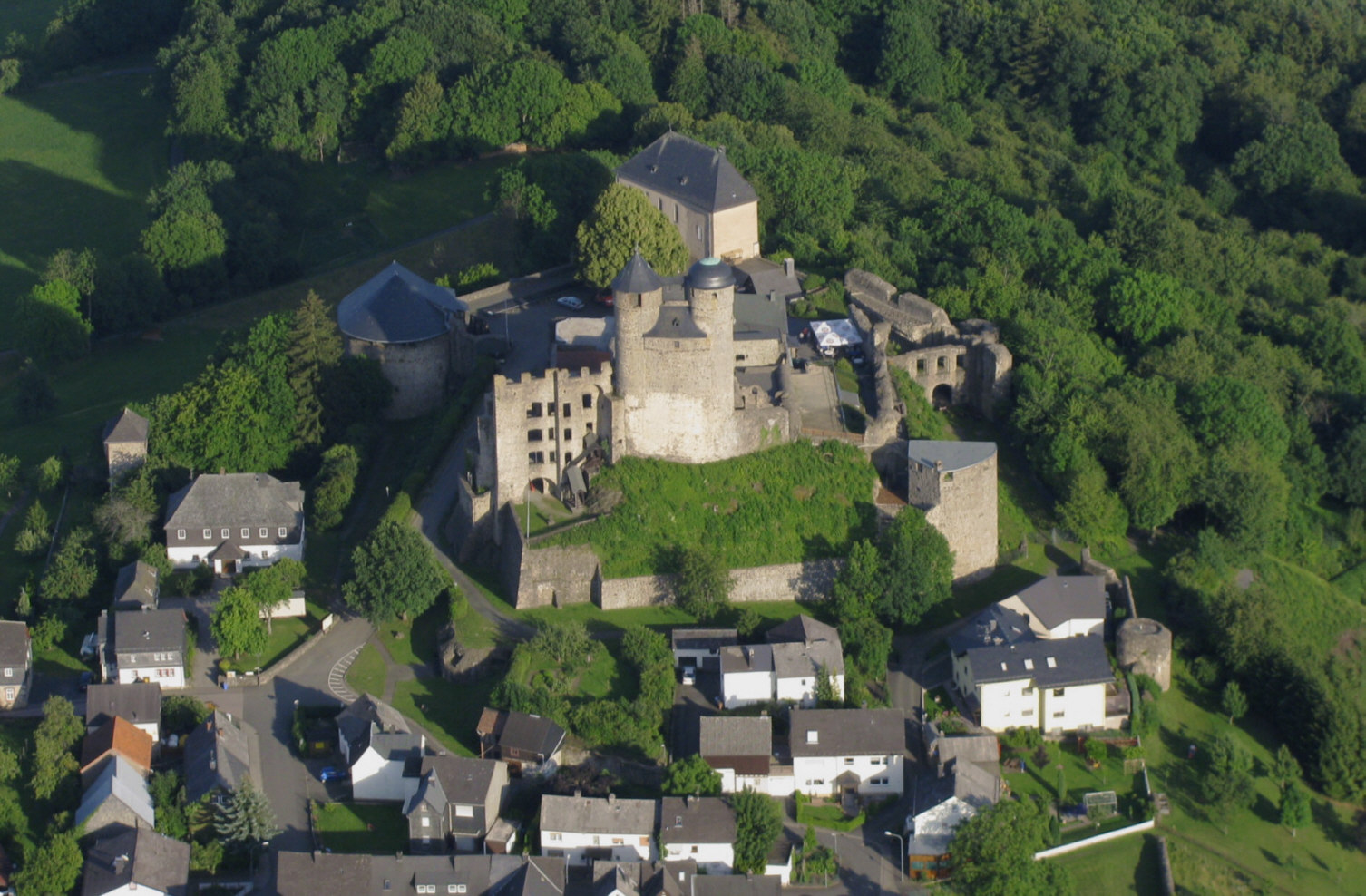
Greifenstein Castle (owned 1382−1969 by the House of Solms)

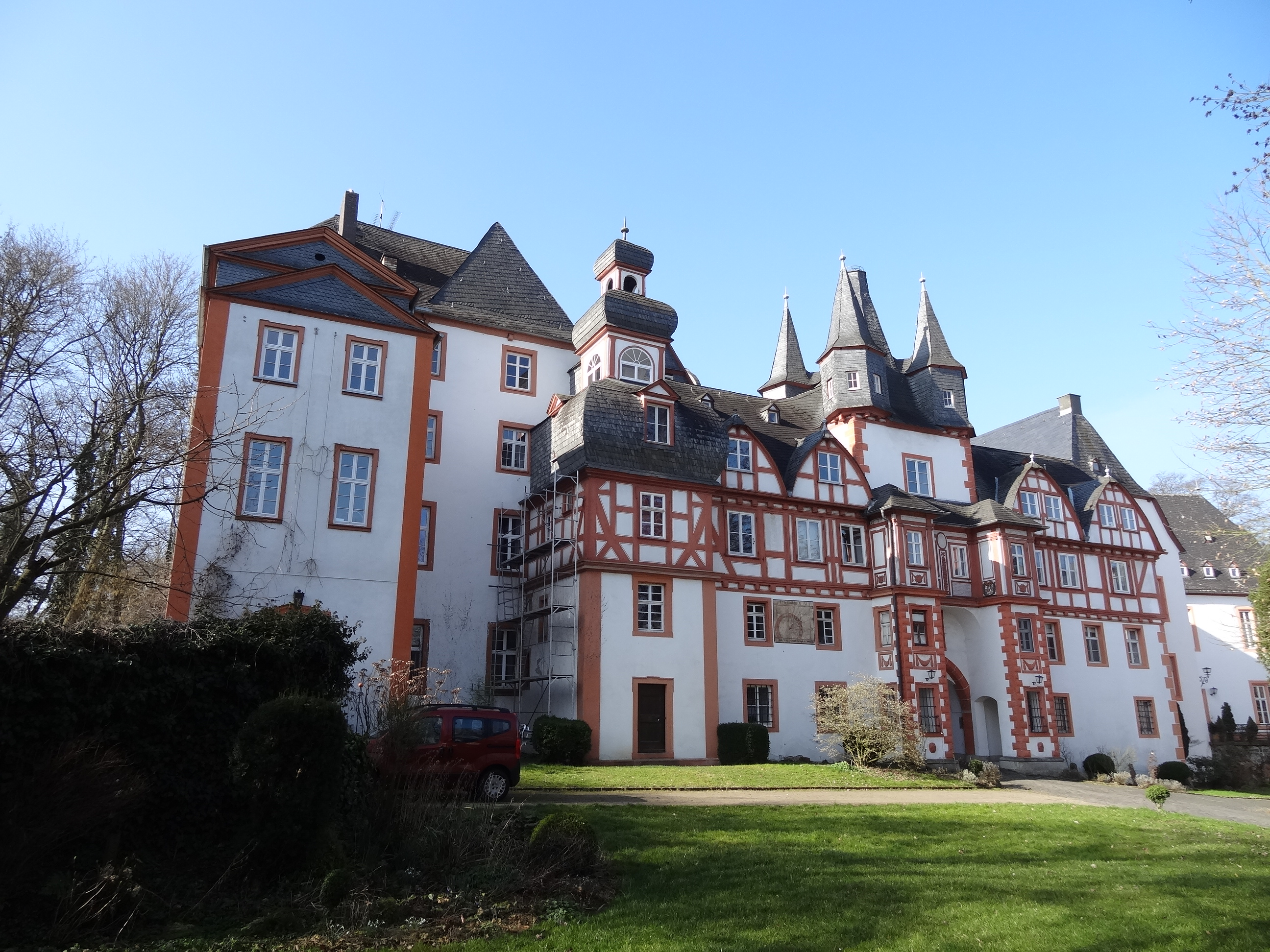
Hungen Castle (owned 1418−1974 by Solms-Braunfels)

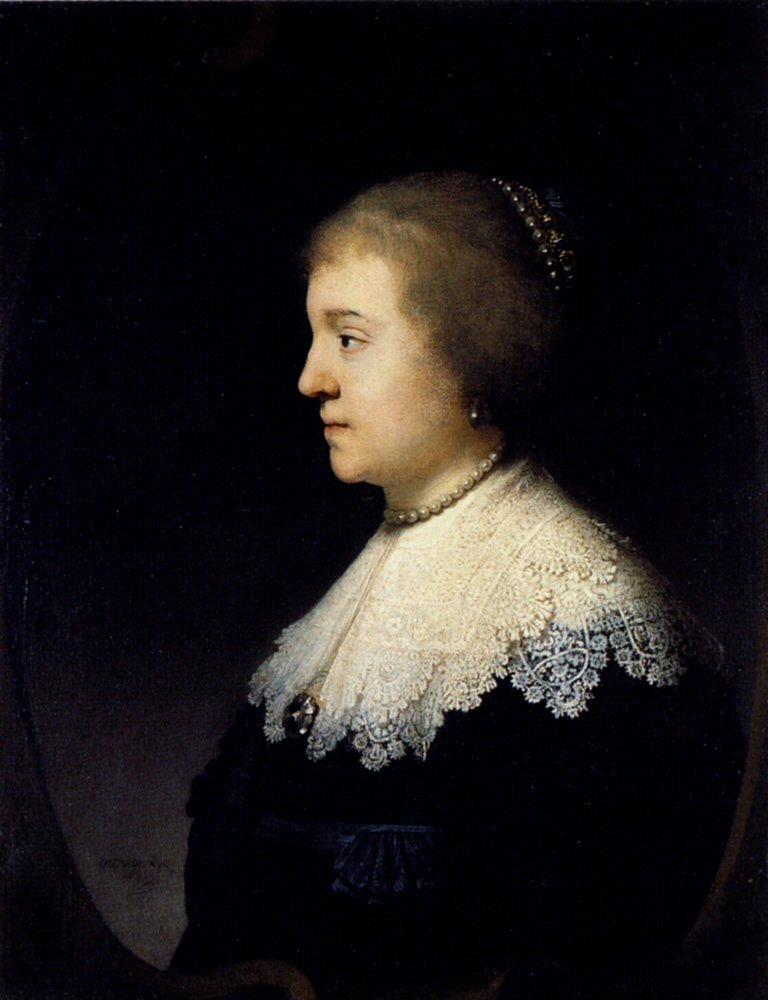
Amalia of Solms-Braunfels (1602–75), wife of Frederick Henry, Prince of Orange (portrait by Rembrandt van Rijn, 1632)

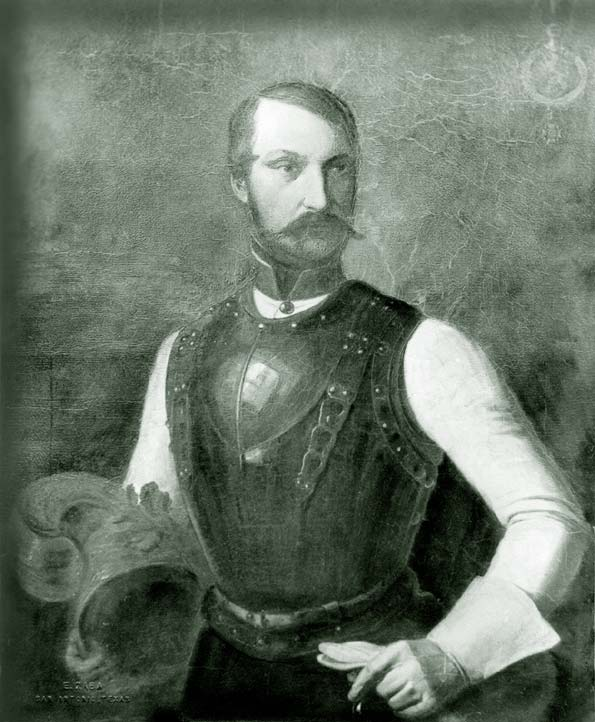
Carl of Solms-Braunfels (1812–1875), Founder of New Braunfels, Texas
