= Schoenhals =

Schoenhals or Schönhals is a surname. Notable people with the surname include:

- Albrecht Schoenhals (1888–1978), German film actor
- Karl von Schönhals (1788–1857), Austrian general
- Michael Schoenhals (born 1953), Swedish sinologist
- Paul Schoenhals (born 1941), Canadian politician
