= Braunfels Castle =

Princely castle in Braunfels, Hessen, Germany

Coordinates: 50.5138°N 8.3875°E

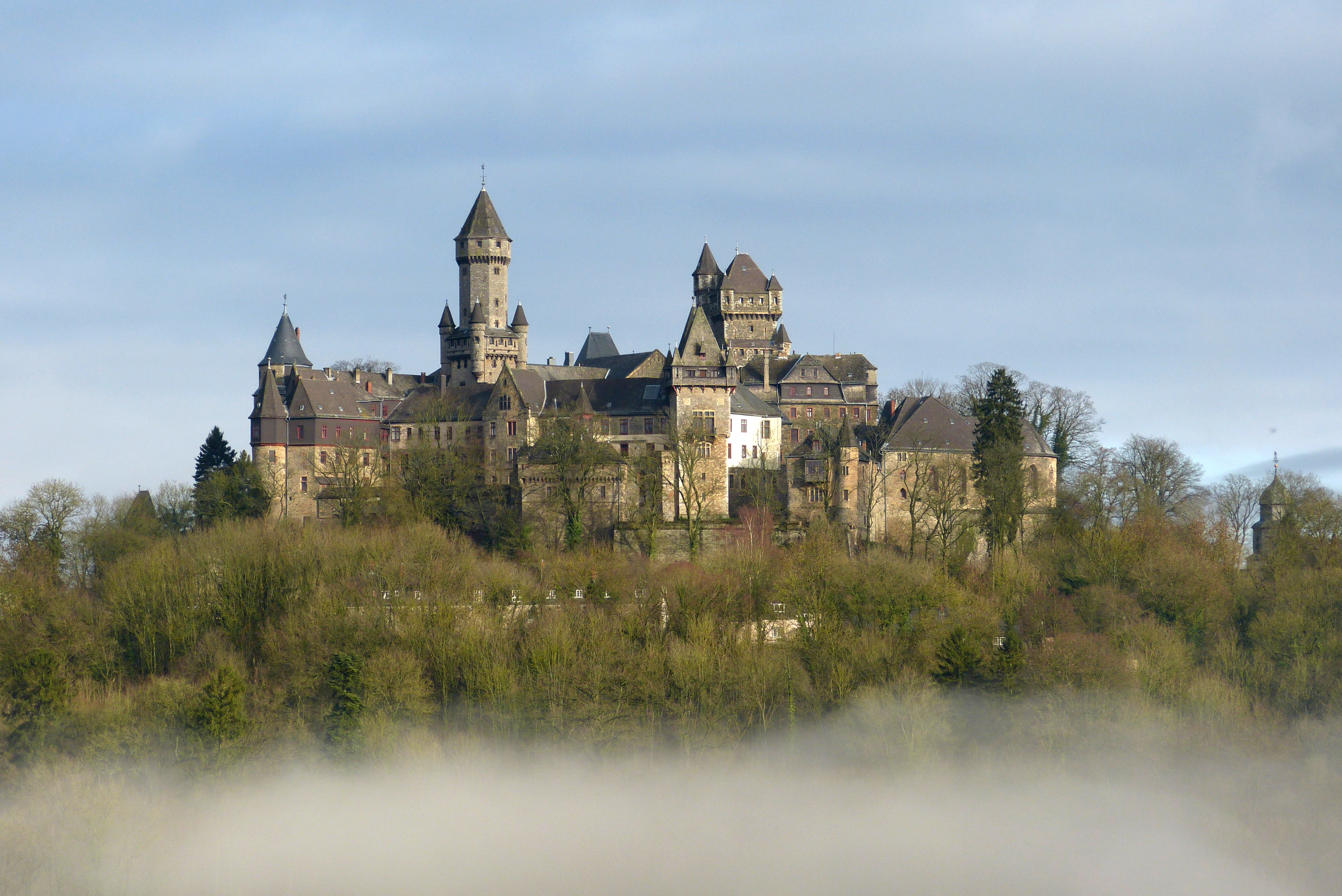
Braunfels Castle in the morning mist

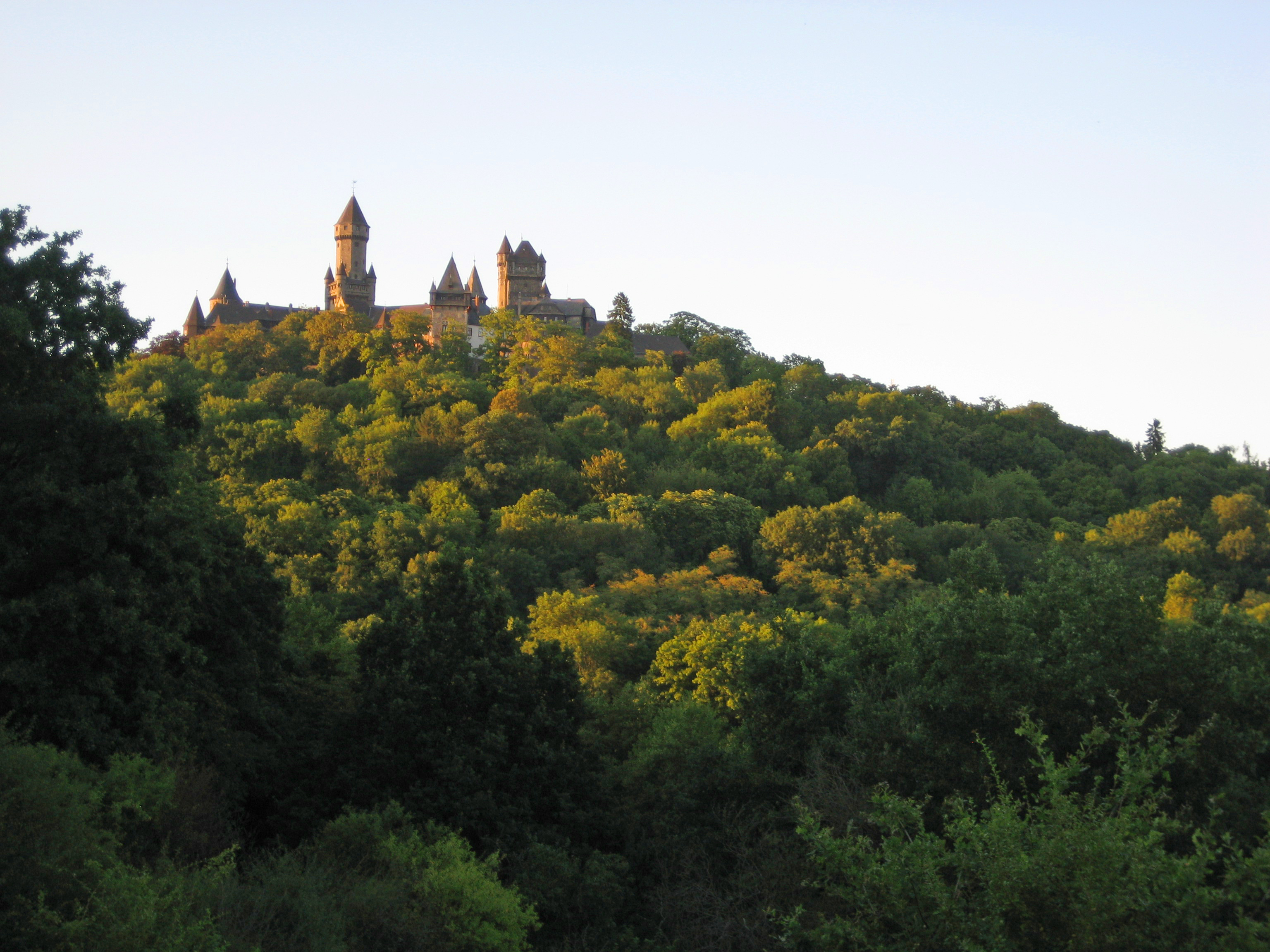
Braunfels Castle (2013) - The octagonal tower on the left is the new keep, while the one on the right is the old keep.

Situated atop a basalt hill, Braunfels Castle (German: Schloss Braunfels) overlooks the spa town of Braunfels in the Lahn-Dill-Kreis, Hesse, Germany. Since the 13th century, it has served as the residence and seat of government for the Counts, and later Princes, of Solms-Braunfels. Remarkably, the castle remains in the possession of the family to this day, now under the stewardship of the Counts of Oppersdorff-Solms-Braunfels.

Braunfels Castle commands the surrounding landscape, extending its presence deep into the Lahn Valley, and serves as a scenic and cultural counterpart to Schaumburg Castle in the lower Lahn Valley. In the 19th century, the castle was extensively remodeled in the Gothic Revival style, characterized by the deliberate use of distinctive forms. As a result, Braunfels Castle stands as an exceptional example of the romantic and historicist architecture of that period in Germany.

Today, the Princely family has opened the castle to the public to visit. Also, the castle serves as a filming location.

== Name ==
Braunfels means brown rock in German.

== History ==
=== Middle Ages ===
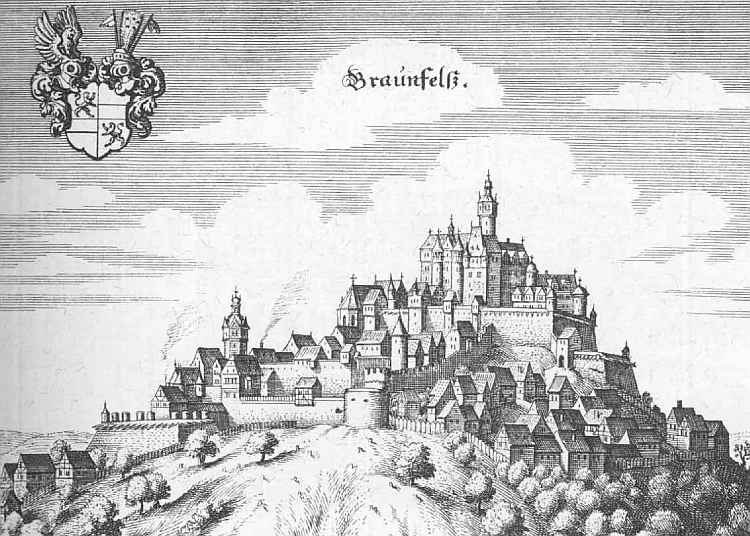
Schloss Braunfels on an engraving by Matthäus Merian

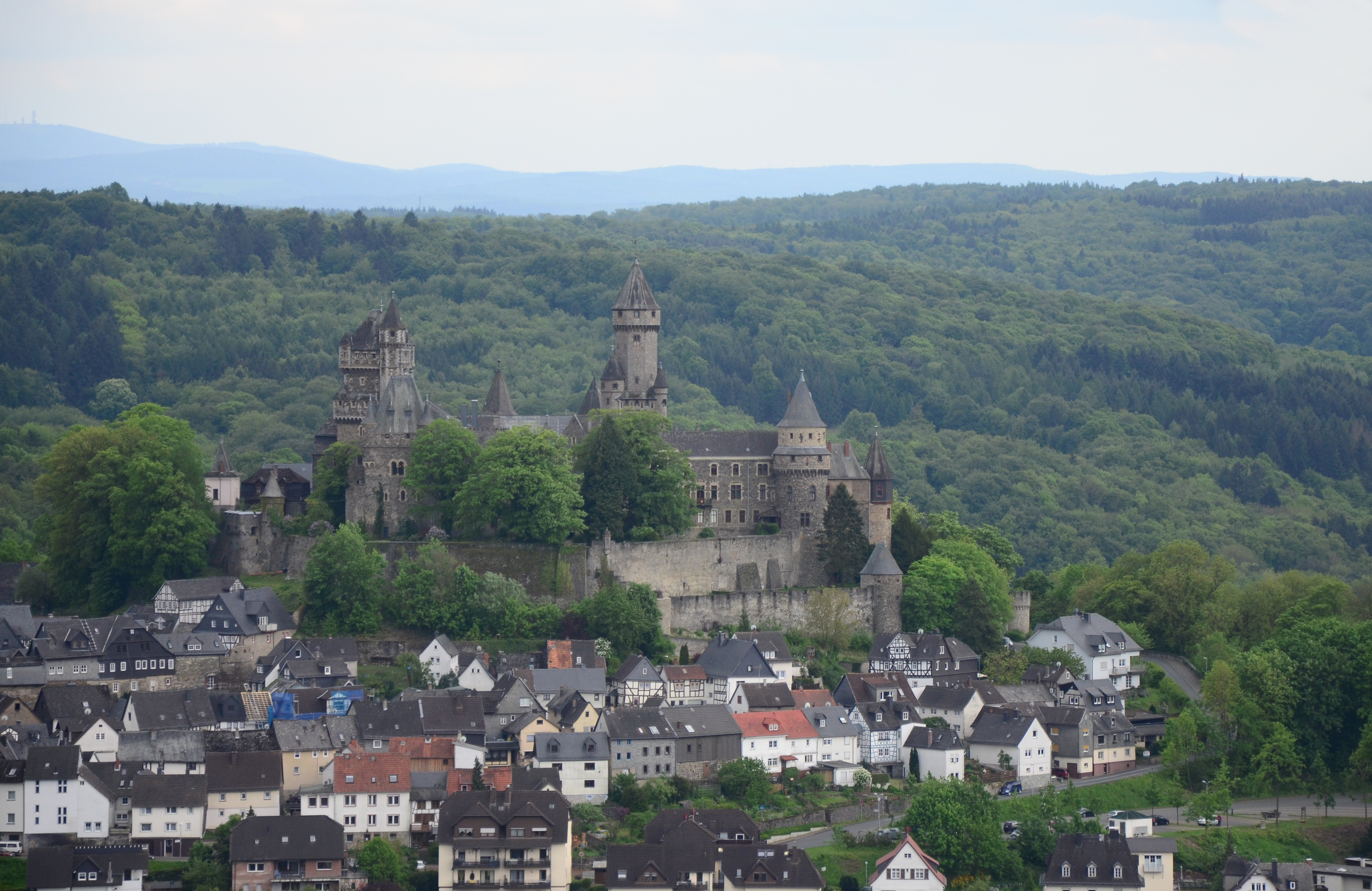
Braunfels Castle (2016)

The castle was first mentioned in a document in 1246 as castellum brunenvelz. Originally a defensive fortress against the Counts of Nassau, it became the residence of the Counts of Solms from 1280 onwards. After the division of family estates into three branches and the destruction of the ancestral castle of Solms by the Rhenish Towns League, Braunfels Castle became the new ancestral seat of the Counts of Solms-Braunfels in 1384, the only surviving line of the three. By 1418, it had inherited all the property. After further divisions and reunifications, this line still exists today.

Between the 15th and 17th centuries, extensive expansions of the main castle took place. Count Otto II had the medieval castle expanded into a fortress around 1500, with the late Gothic castle church from this phase still preserved. An engraving by August Rumpf, depicted by Matthäus Merian in his Topographia Hassiae of 1655, provides insight into the condition of the castle before its Baroque transformation, which started in 1680.

=== Thirty Years' War ===
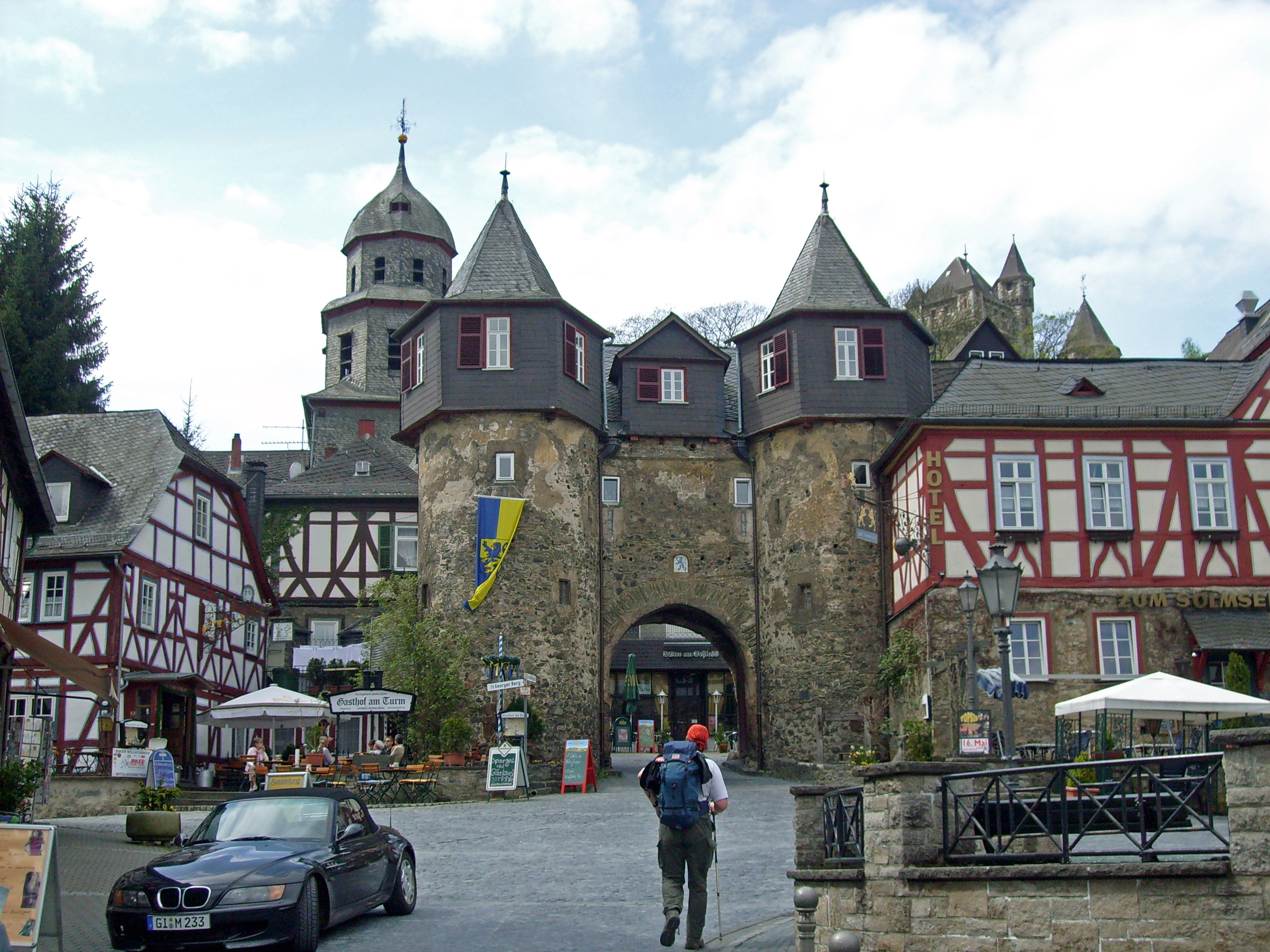
Entrance to Schloss Braunfels from the town

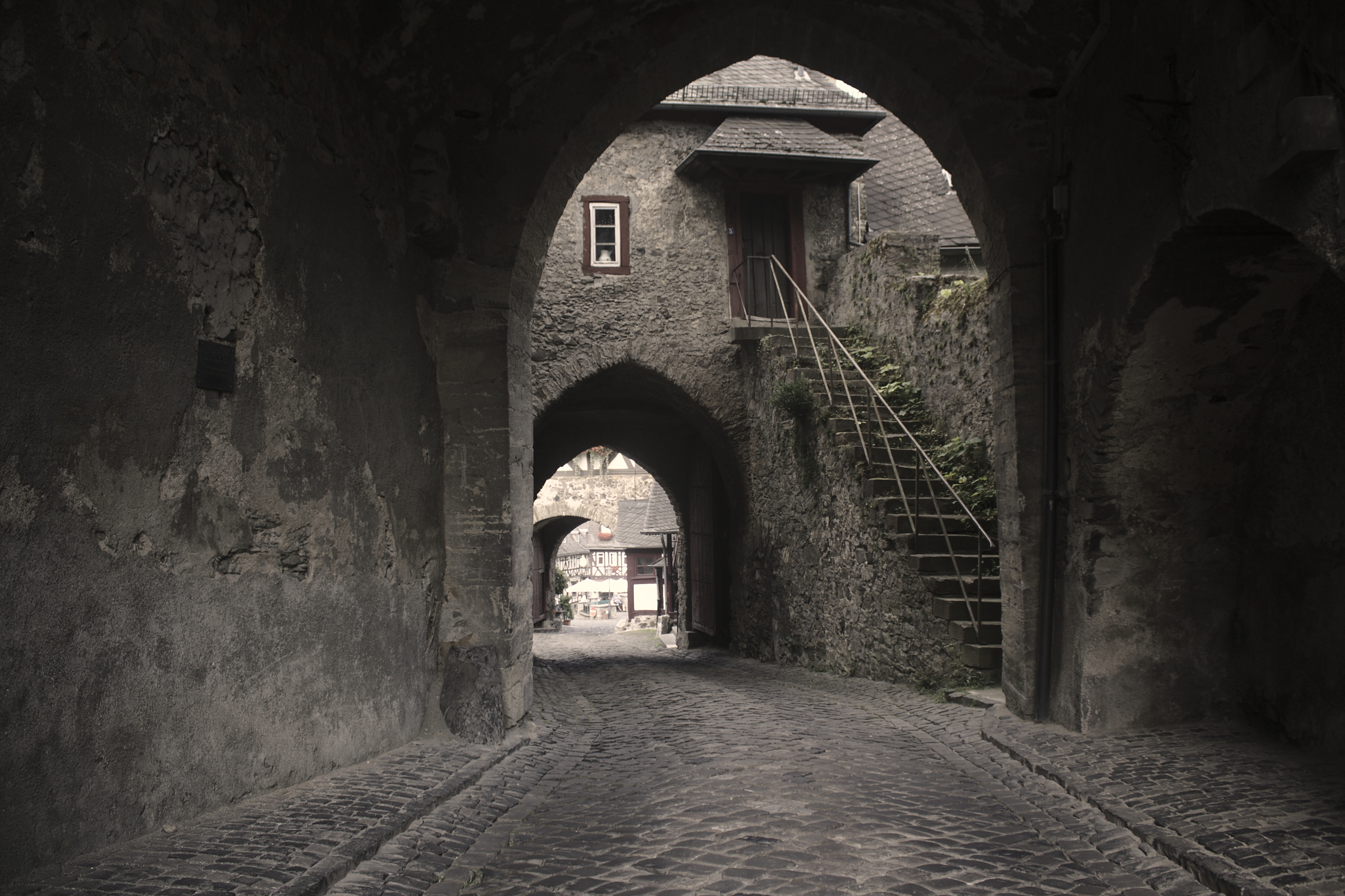
A view through the castle gates

During the Thirty Years' War, Braunfels Castle was contested and heavily damaged. Due to his support for Frederick V, the Winter King, Count Johann Albrecht I of Solms-Braunfels was placed under Imperial ban, and in 1621, the castle was taken without resistance by Spanish troops on behalf of the emperor. In 1629, Count Philipp Moritz of Hohensolms successfully besieged Braunfels town and castle.

In 1630, Emperor Ferdinand II bestowed Johann Tserclaes, Count of Tilly with the castle. In 1632, Swedish troops captured the castle, only to lose it again to the imperial forces in 1634. A year later, in 1635, count Louis Henry of Nassau-Dillenburg seized the castle in a surprise attack. In 1640, after a siege, the troops of Bernard of Saxe-Weimar in French service captured the castle, but Count Johann Albrecht II of Solms-Braunfels regained control in 1641.

==== Amalia of Solms-Braunfels ====
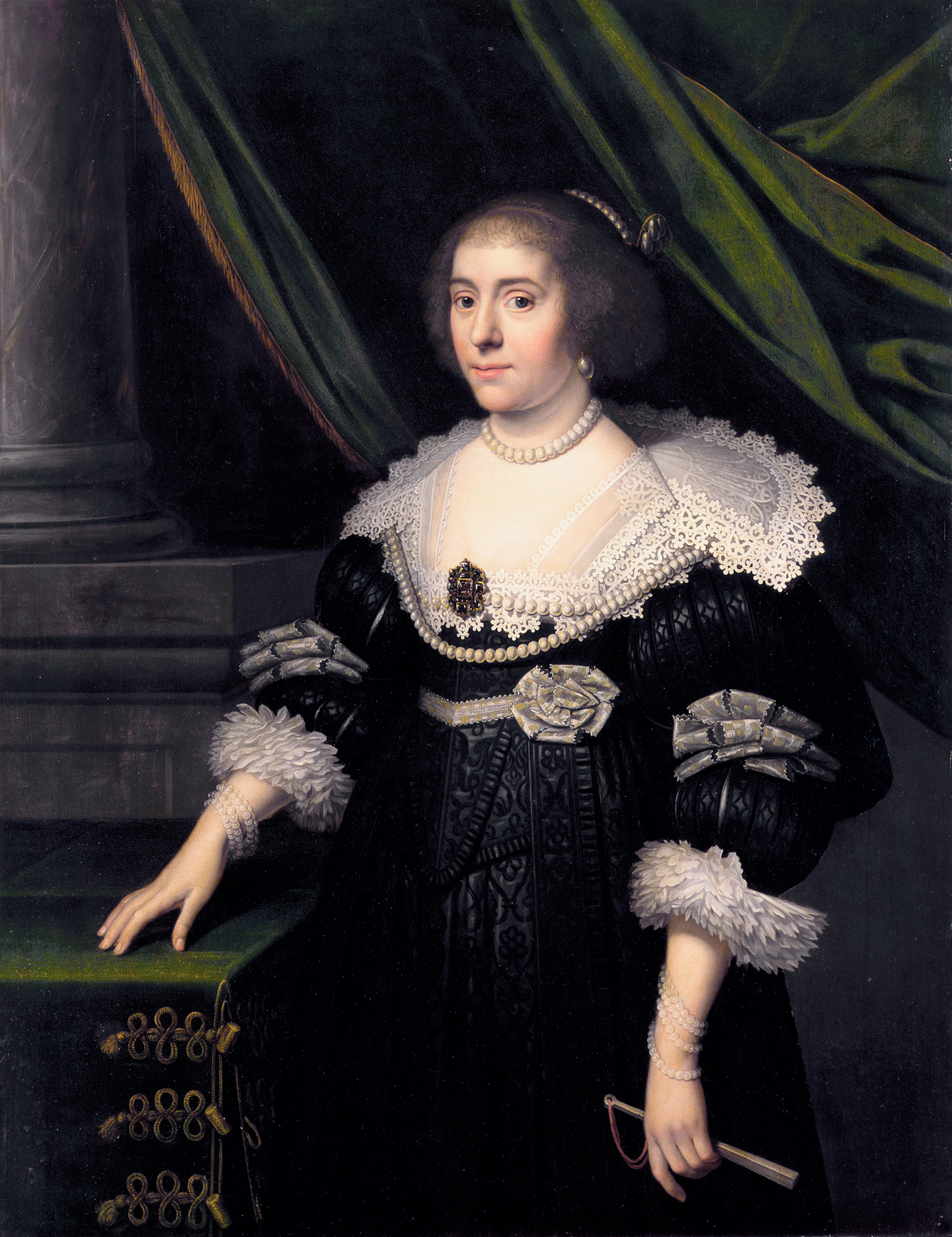
Amalia of Solms-Braunfels by Michiel van Mierevelt

Amalia of Solms-Braunfels (1602–1675), born at Braunfels Castle, was the tenth of thirteen children of Count Johann Albrecht I of Solms-Braunfels and Countess Agnes zu Sayn-Wittgenstein. Due to the Thirty Years' War, she and her family fled to the Netherlands, where she married Frederick Henry, Prince of Orange in 1625. She acted as the political adviser of her spouse during his reign, and acted as his de facto deputy and regent during his infirmity from 1640 to 1647. She also served as chair of the regency council during the minority of her grandson William III, Prince of Orange from 1650 until 1672. Through strategic marriages, she significantly increased her influence across Europe. Her grandson William III married Mary Stuart and became King of England, Ireland, and Scotland from 1689 until his death in 1702. Other daughters married into notable families, including Frederick William, Elector of Brandenburg.

She transformed the court in The Hague into a European cultural center. Amalia's legacy includes her political prowess and architectural commissions like the palace of Huis ten Bosch in The Hague. She is remembered as a significant European figure with deep ties to Braunfels.

=== Baroque transformation ===
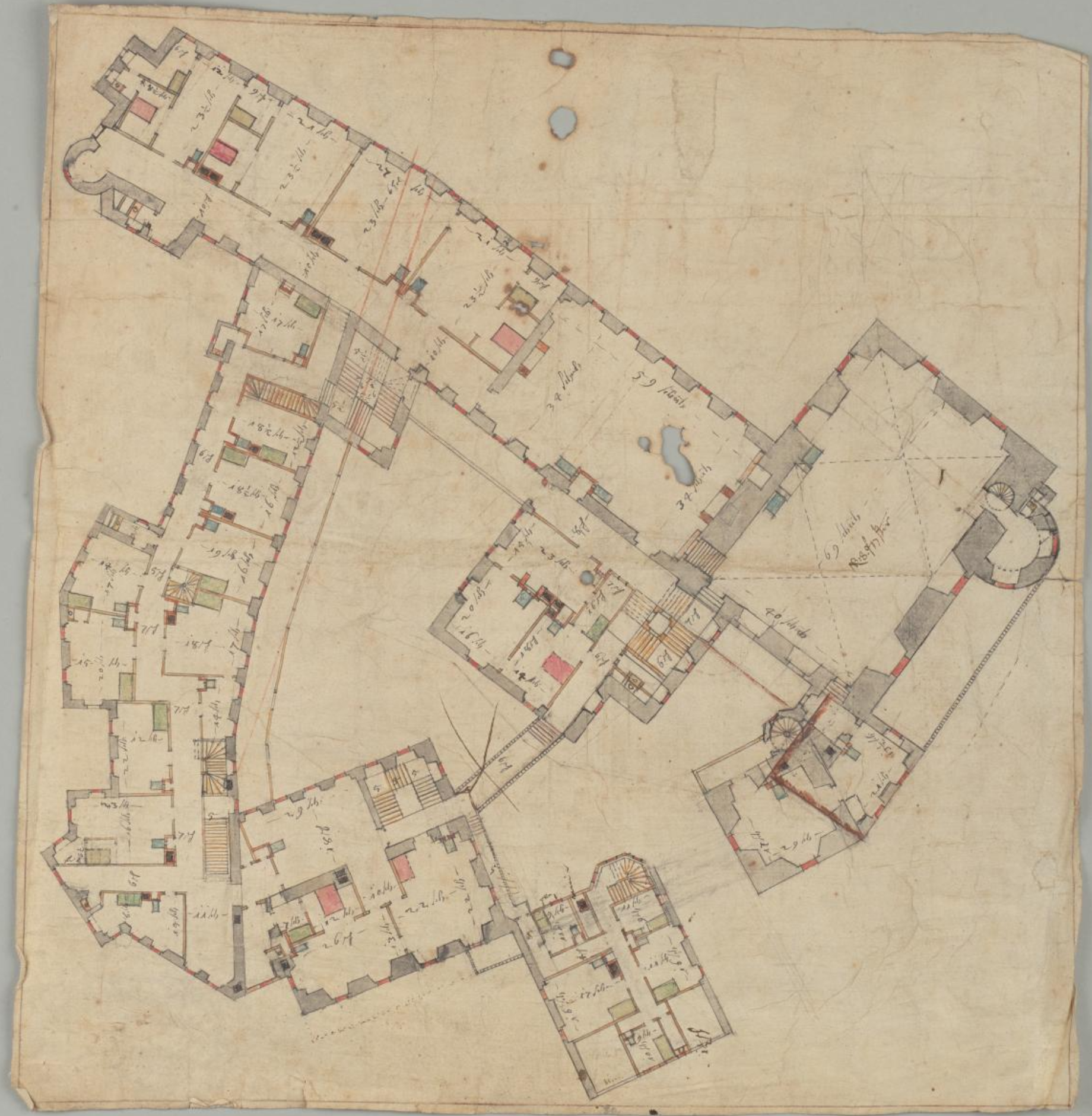
Floorplan design of Braunfels Castle in 1660 (Hessisches Staatsarchiv Marburg)

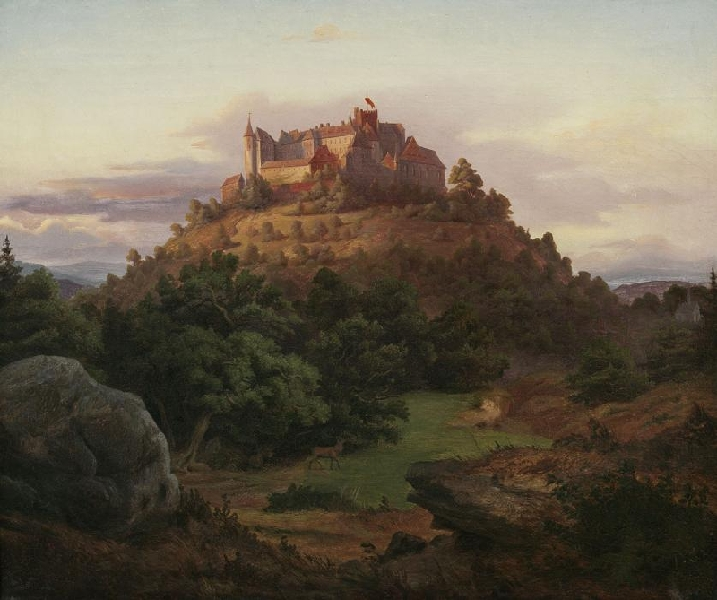
Braunfels Castle by Johannes Deiker (1845)

Count Hendrik Trajectinus (1636–1693) was a Dutch States Army officer and supported his cousin, William of Orange, during his invasion of England as part of the Glorious Revolution. Under his command, a contingent of the Blue Guards was the first to enter London, securing it for William. He later accompanied William, now King William III of England, on his Irish campaign in 1690, participating in the Battle of the Boyne, a decisive victory over the Irish Army of James II.

Hendrik Trajectinus transformed Braunfels castle into a Baroque style palace, though it was destroyed in a major city fire in 1679. After the Count, the last member of the main Solms line, died in 1693, his successor and cousin Wilhelm Moritz (1651–1724), who lived in Greifenstein castle and belonged to the Greifenstein line of the Solms family, moved his residence to Braunfels. Wilhelm Moritz managed to rebuild it quickly at the start of the 18th century. In 1696, he designed the inner courtyard with a chessboard pattern, and in 1700 expanded the so-called Ottonische Bau. In 1704, he established the Braunfels game park. The Cabinettsbau—formerly the bakery, brewery, and administrative building (now a café)—was enlarged and completed in 1712. Additionally, Wilhelm Moritz constructed the Lange Bau and the Entréebau, extending the complex westward with the Prinz-Albrecht-Bau to provide more living space for his growing family. However, his and architect Johann Philipp Meyer's ambitious plans (around 1720) for a large Baroque palace with a huge glass dome were never fully realized. Probably part of the funding was realized out of the sale of the County of Tecklenburg to Prussia in 1707. Wilhelm Moritz had just received the county in 1699 after a 150-year legal process. For being able to push through this deal against his agnates, he was awarded the Order of the Black Eagle by King Frederick I of Prussia on 13 July 1707, and was appointed to the Privy Council.

But Wilhelm Moritz was not only focused on grandeur. As a ruler, he did much for his county, promoting the economy by founding iron works and factories. He also welcomed foreign manufacturers, merchants, and craftsmen—particularly Huguenots—into the county. He initiated the formation of guilds for tailors, bakers, coopers, brewers, and shepherds. Most notably, the town of Braunfels owes its beautiful, picturesque marketplace to him.

Wilhelm Moritz died on 9 February 1724, at the age of 73. His son, Frederick William (1696–1761), became the 1st Prince of Solms-Braunfels, elevated to this imperial rank by Emperor Charles VII on 22 May 1742. Due to poor health, Frederick William did not govern extensively, but he succeeded in arranging advantageous marriages for his children, securing alliances with powerful families across the country.

=== 19th century ===
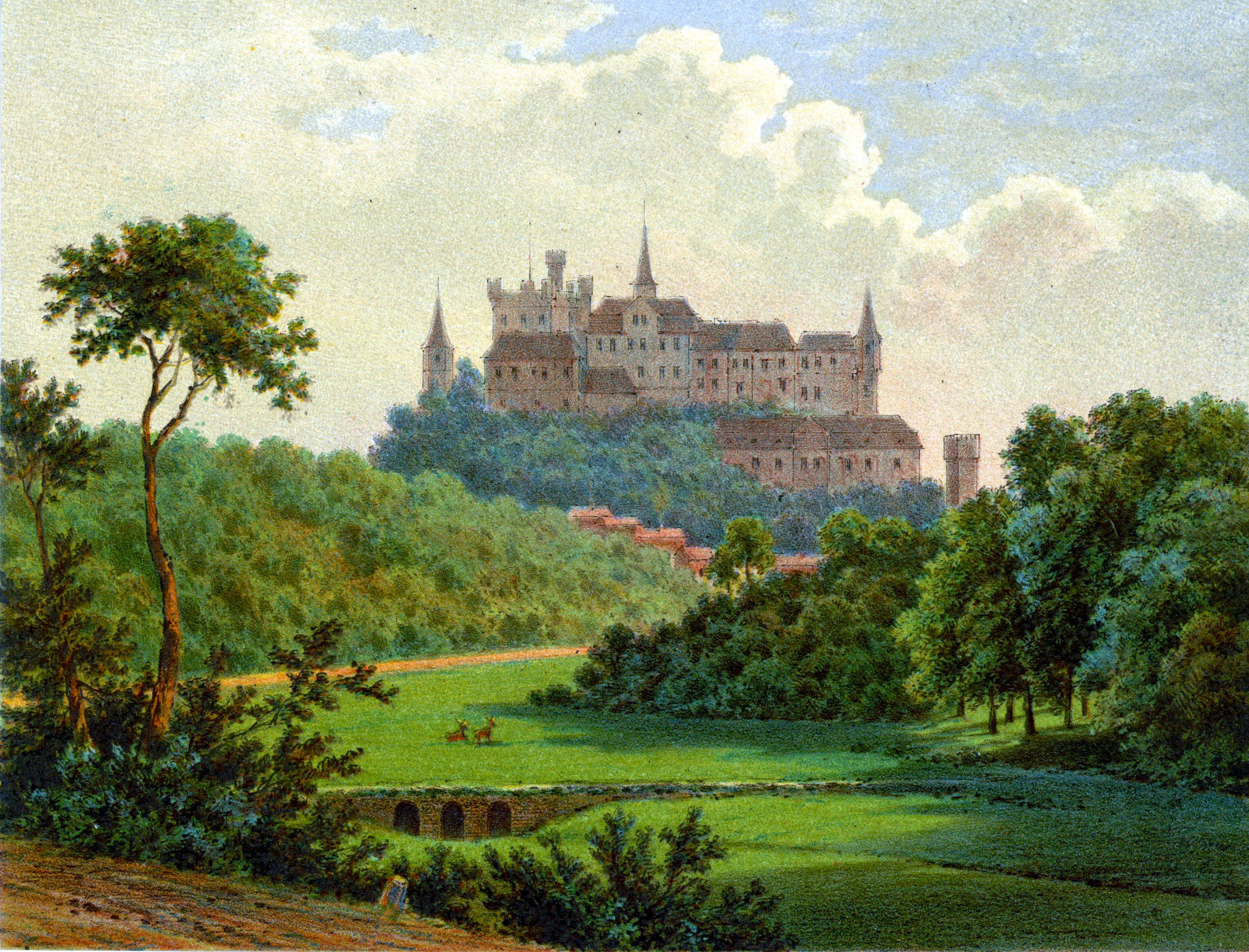
Braunfels Castle by Alexander Duncker around 1866

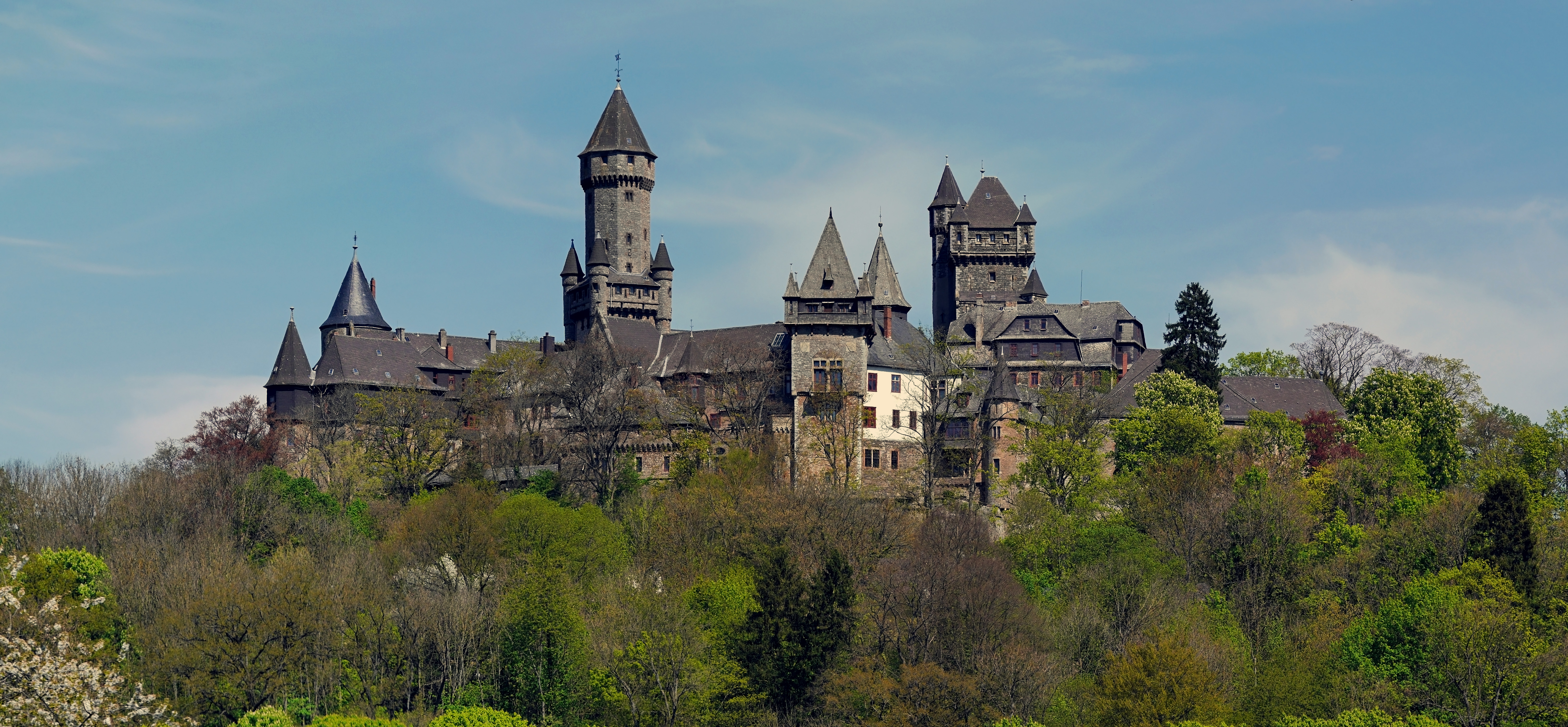
Braunfels Castle (2014)

In 1806, the principality of Solms-Braunfels was mediatised and its territories became part of the Duchy of Nassau. In 1815, the principality became part of the Rhine province of Prussia. However, the castle remained in the hands of the princely family, and continued to be seat of the princely government from 1828 to 1848.

Two reconstructions in the 19th century changed the appearance of the castle and created what some called the Hessian Neuschwanstein Castle:

Around 1840, 4th Prince Ferdinand (1797–1873) carried out neo-Gothic alterations and restorations. In the spirit of Romanticism, with the aim of reviving the Middle Ages, an idealized fantasy castle was created, unlike anything that had existed in the actual Middle Ages. The model for this work was the renovation of Rheinstein Castle in the spirit of the Rhine romanticism. Prince Ferdinand was closely befriended to Rheinstein's owner, prince Frederick of Prussia. At the same time, Prince Ferdinand had the Diana Castle built near Greifenstein as a hunting lodge.

The Knights' Hall (German: Rittersaal) was ceremoniously opened on 29 July 1847, exactly on Princess Ottilie's 40th birthday. Her husband, Prince Ferdinand, had achieved a truly special birthday gift, which also provided the perfect setting for the celebration.

Starting in 1880, under the 6th Prince George (1836–1891) and his wife, Princess Emanuela, Braunfels Castle underwent significant expansions in the style of historicism, including the addition of a second keep, oriels, and small towers. Architects Edwin Oppler, Hugo von Ritgen, and Rudolf Wiegmann—drawing inspiration from figures like Eugène Viollet-le-Duc, Émile, and Paul Boeswillwald—oversaw the construction. Through his mother's marriage, Prince George was the half-brother of King George V of Hanover, who built the neo-Gothic Welfenschloss in Hanover and Marienburg Castle, where Oppler was also involved, explaining the architect's connection to Braunfels Castle.

The topping of the new octagonal keep was celebrated on 2 July 1884. After its completion, the historicist expansion of Braunfels Castle was considered admirable: the castle was regarded by many as one of the most beautiful in the German countries.

=== Von Oppersdorff-Solms-Braunfels ===
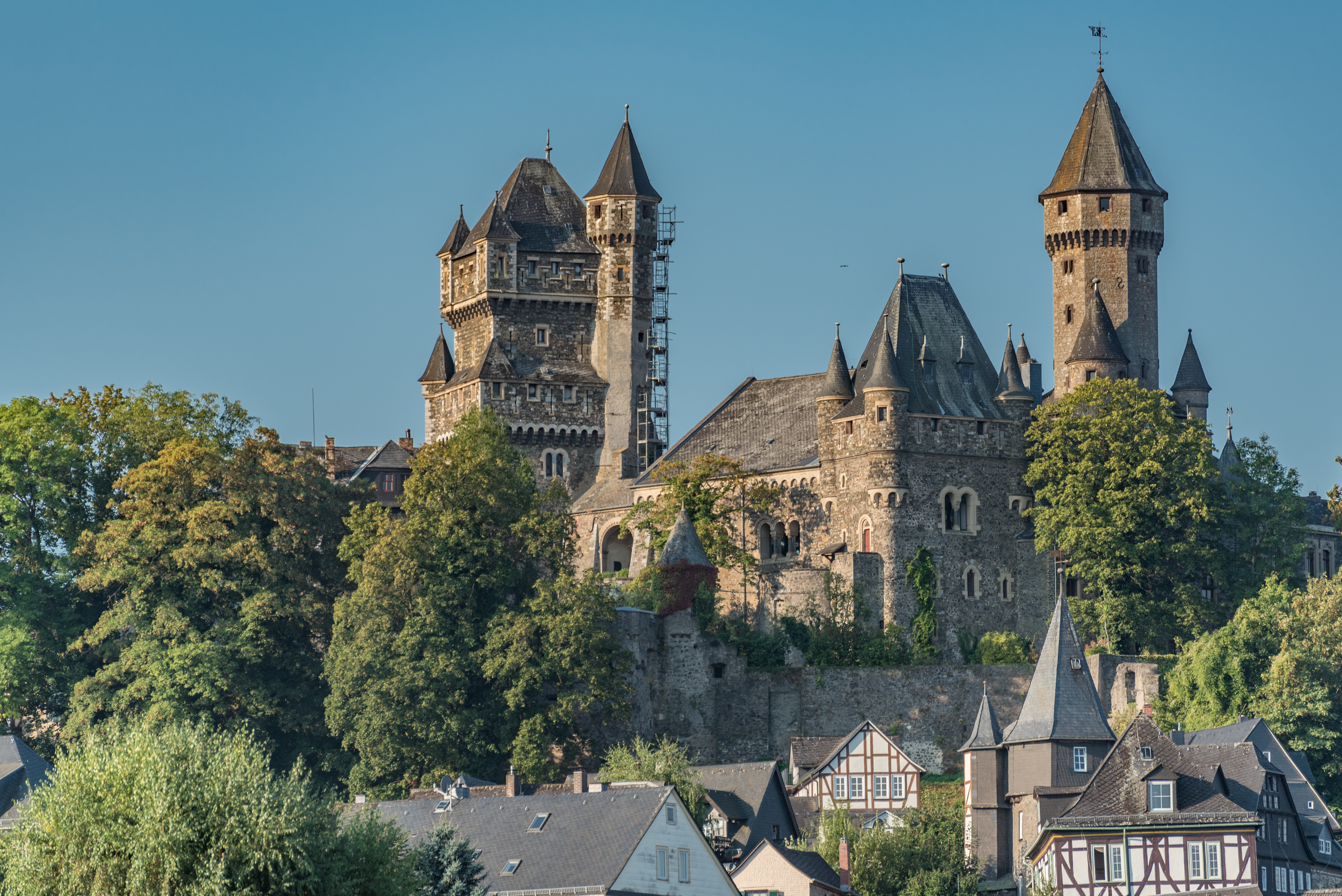
Schloss Braunfels (2016)

The main branch of the princely House of Solms-Braunfels became extinct, when Georg Frederick Victor, the 7th prince, died in 1970. The castles in Braunfels and Hungen including their agricultural and forest estates were inherited by the last Prince's daughter, Maria Gabrielle of Solms-Braunfels (1918−2003), and her husband Hans Georg Count von Oppersdorff (1920−2003).

The counts von Oppersdorff are originally an ancient German noble family, originated in Silesia, with their seat at Schloss Oberglogau in what is now Głogówek, Poland. Since 1969, they and their offspring bear the name Count/Countess von Oppersdorff-Solms-Braunfels, with consent of the Hessian Ministry of the Interior. Count Hans Georg managed the estate for over 50 years, overseeing the renovation, restoration, and upkeep of the castle, its inventory, and its associated buildings.

== Architecture ==
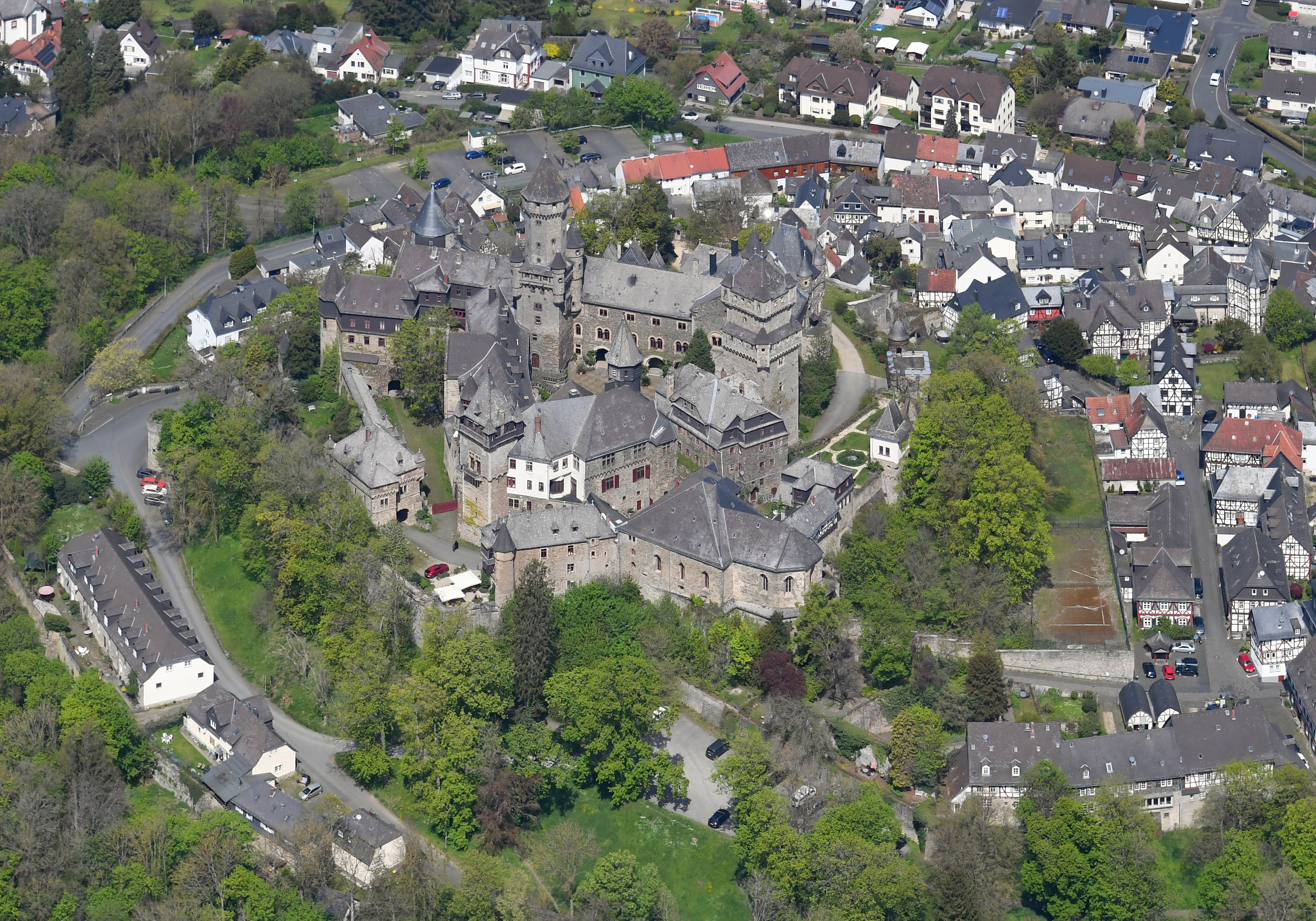
Aerial view of Braunfels Castle

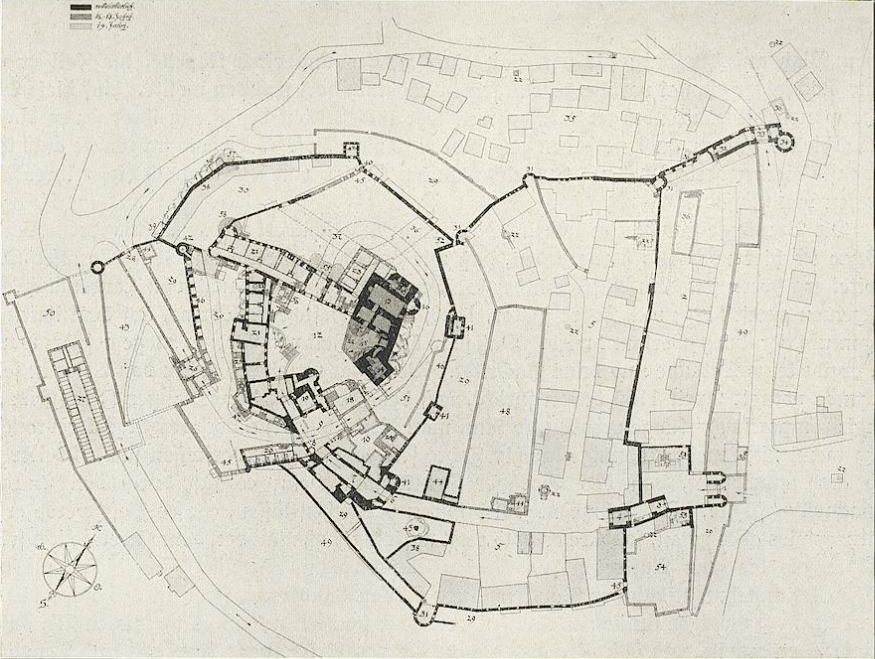
Floor plan of Schloss Braunfels

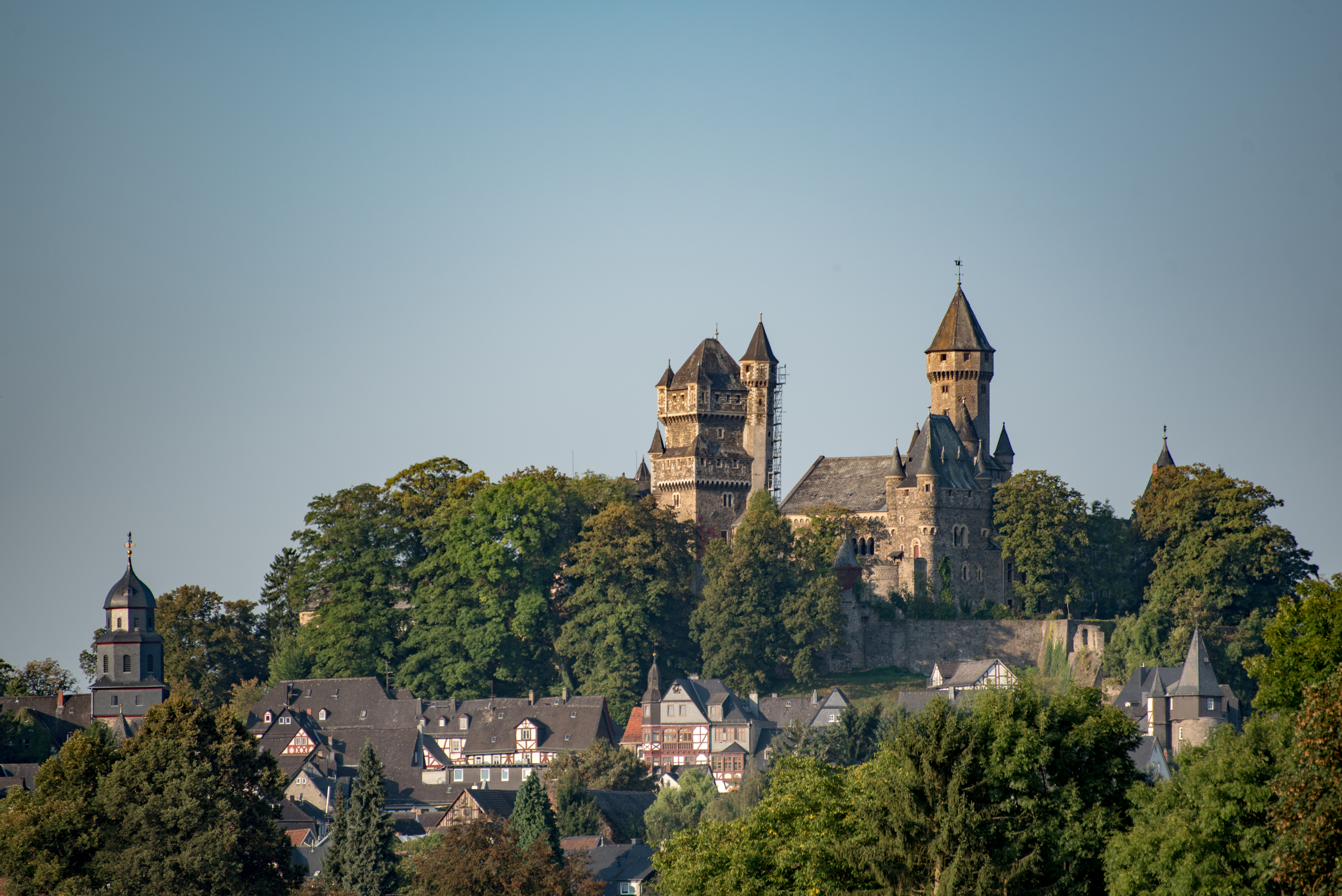
Braunfels Castle and the town

Due to its long construction history, the exterior of the castle remained stylistically quite heterogeneous until the last major renovation. Since that renovation, completed in 1885, much of the complex exhibits the style of Historicism. The main elements are:

- The core castle from the 13th century, featuring the boundary watchtower ("Friedrichsturm"), the keep ("Alter Stock"), the palas, and the shield wall. Despite later alterations, Romanesque style elements are still clearly visible, such as the massive masonry with round-arched biforas with an overarching arch, a central column with leaf capitals.
- Extensions, including an outer bailey and battlements to the east toward the town (the attack side): the "Unterste Pforte" gate from around 1350, the middle gate tower from around 1460 (with a Baroque upper structure and its conversion into a bell tower in 1682), the upper castle gate with a pointed arch portal from 1491; the Ottonian building ("Fürstenbau", around 1500), and the castle church, a three-nave hall church built above the galleries of the upper zwinger (probably consecrated in 1501, with wall paintings from 1504).
- Baroque additions: the "Neutor" (Archive Gate) in the northwest, the entrance building (gatehouse to the castle courtyard), the Long Building (south of the New Keep), the Weeden Building, as well as the stables, castle guardhouse, and barracks (first erected just before the great city fire of 1679 and later reconstructed).

In the Historicist style: notably the "Georg Tower" (across from today's castle café) and the heightening of the now-tallest tower of the castle, the New Keep with its flanking turrets (1884).

Due to the continuous renovations, even the older buildings underwent constant changes. For instance, in the 19th century, the Alter Stock, the Palas, and the north tower were adorned with crenellations, and open spaces between previously isolated structures were enclosed.

== The Castle Interior ==
The castle can be visited through guided tours. The main sections are the stately rooms, the collections from the Altenberg Monastery, and the museum dedicated to the princely family.

=== Stately Rooms ===
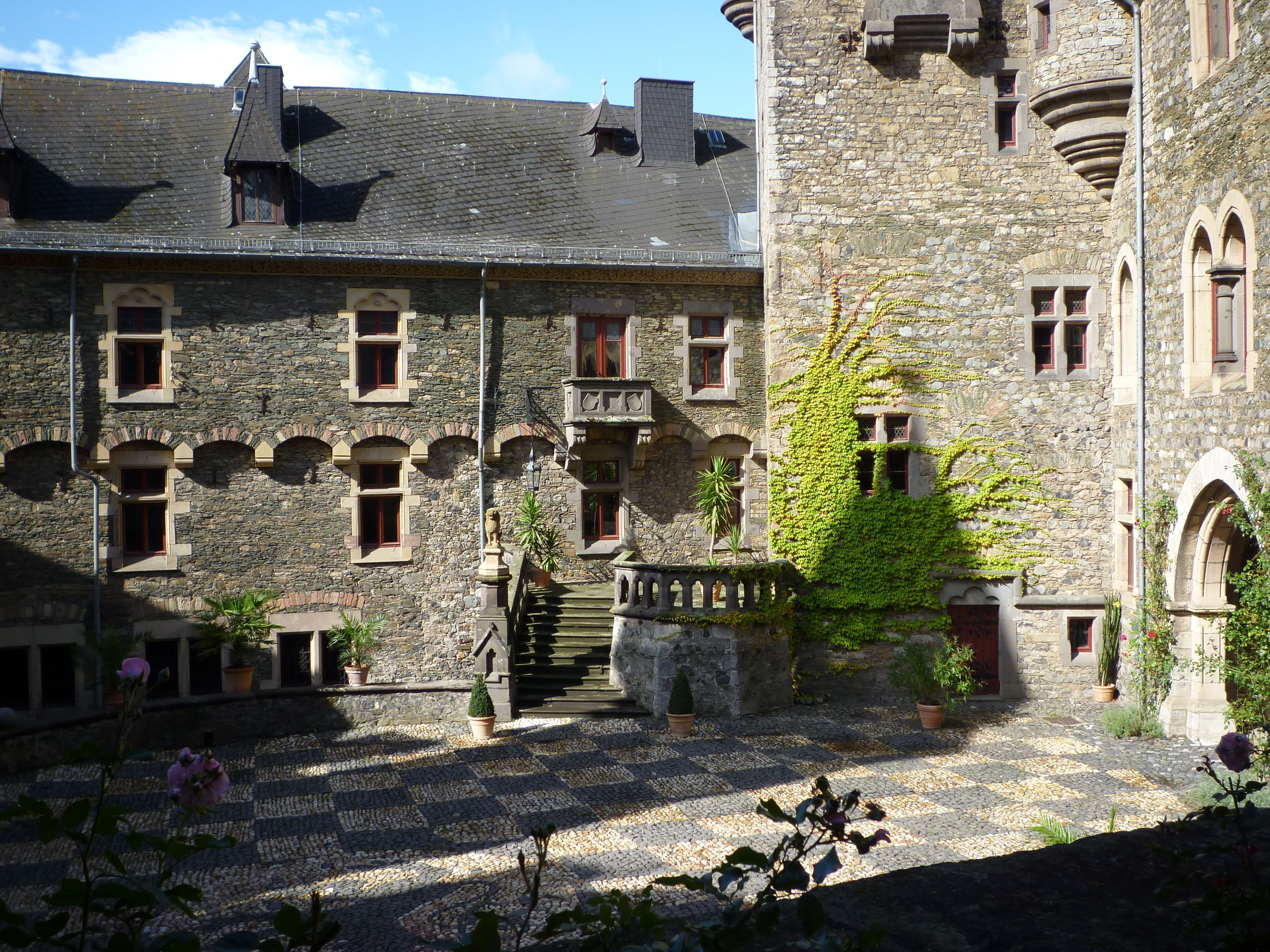
A view into the courtyard

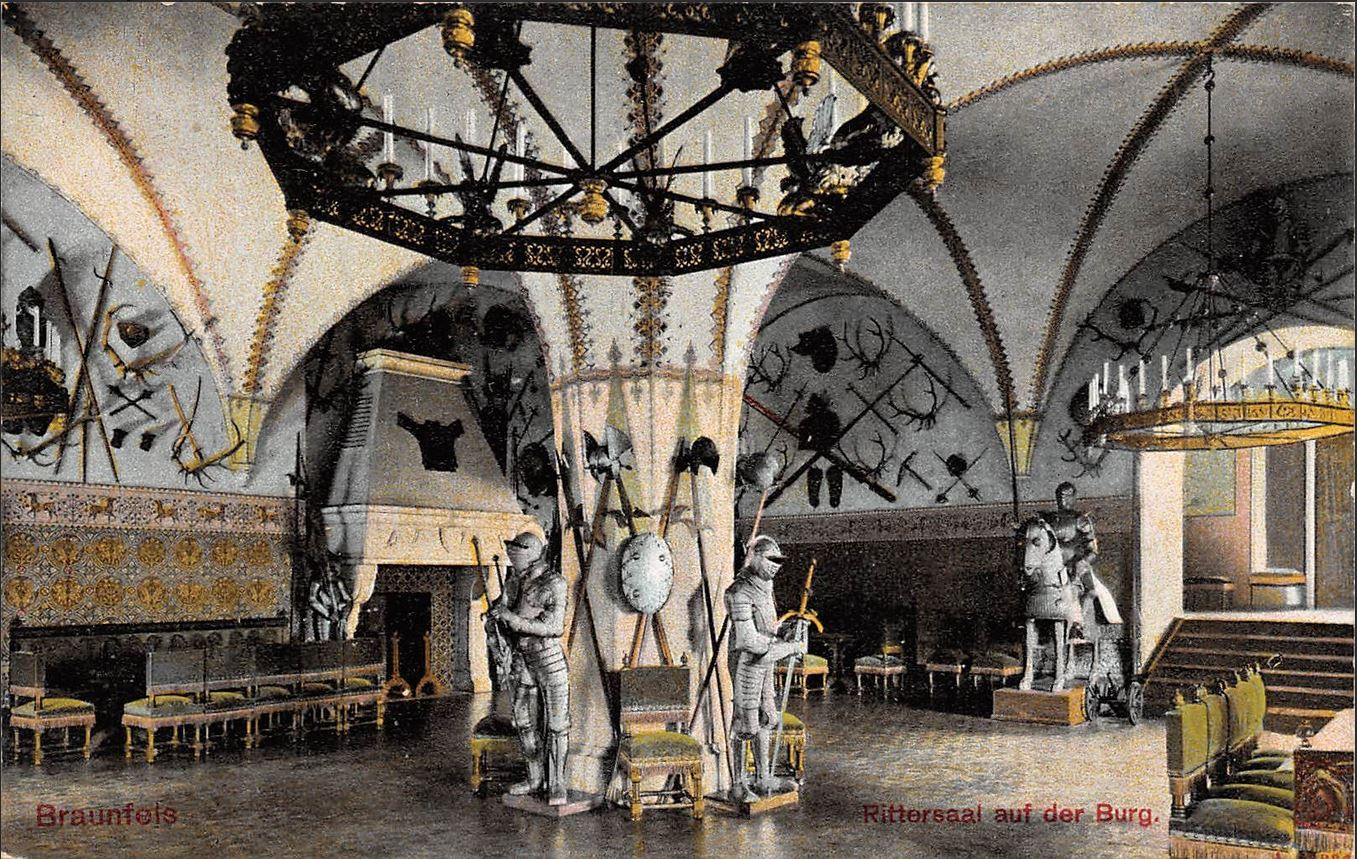
The Knight's Hall

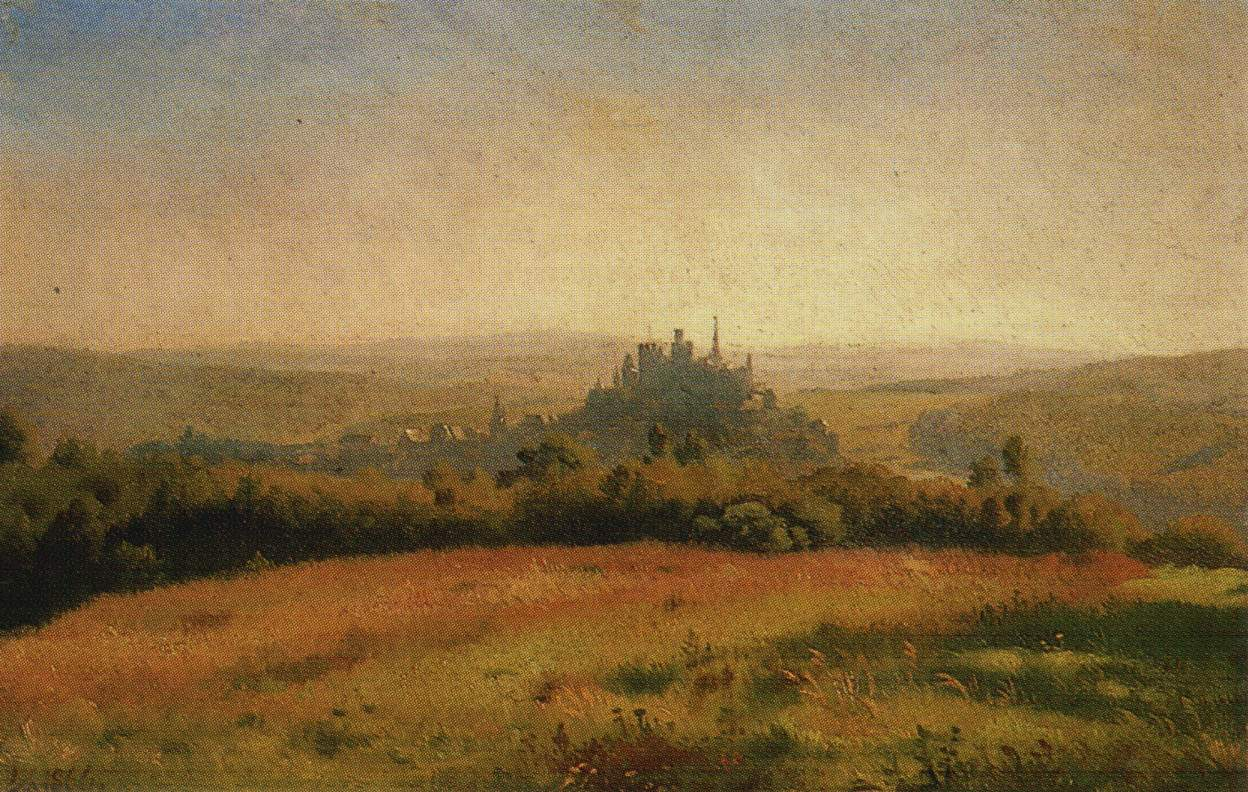
Braunfels Castle by Johannes Deiker

The furniture and art collections of the princely Solms-Braunfels family span from the 13th to the 19th century.

The "Knight's Hall", restored in the 19th century, is located in the medieval palace. It displays swords, polearms, firearms, and armour for warriors and horses from the Middle Ages to the Baroque period. Among the oldest items are a Gothic sword and a Chain mail shirt from the Crusades, made from 60,000 small rings (requiring one to two years of craftsmanship to make). Armor from the Maximilian era likely originates from Milan.

In the Staircase Room and the Painting's Gallery, oil paintings are displayed: mainly family portraits, mythological, and allegorical scenes—by Italian, Spanish, Dutch, and German masters from the Renaissance to Classicism. At the centre of the Staircase room stands a bust of Frederick III, German Emperor and King of Prussia for 99 days between March and June 1888, during the Year of the Three Emperors.

The Tapestry Room features five Flemish tapestries from around 1600, depicting hunting and pastoral scenes. The fireplace dates to 1674 and comes from the Aßlar ironworks.

A highlight of the art collection is the Flemish Room, with portraits, seascapes, and genre scenes by artists such as Adriaen van de Velde, Jan Miense Molenaer, and Adriaen van Ostade. Another fireplace from Aßlar is also found here.

The Tischbein Room is named after the Tischbein family of painters, who worked for the Counts of Solms across several generations in the 18th century. Additional portraits, hunting scenes, and genre paintings are displayed in the Deiker Gallery (court painter to Prince Ferdinand from 1843 to 1868), the Blue Salon, and the Pink Salon. Family antiques in the state rooms include vases of East Asian origin, as well as pieces from St. Petersburg and Berlin porcelain manufactories. A small glass collection is also exhibited in a showcase, featuring Venetian thread glasses and Römer glasses.

=== Altenberg Rooms ===
The so-called "Altenberg Rooms" house furnishings from the former Altenberg Monastery. When the monastery was secularized following the Reichsdeputationshauptschluss of 1803, the Princes of Solms acquired its contents.

The Gothic Room contains a late Gothic altar and a Rhenish Madonna (circa 1400). A chest belonging to Gertrude of Aldenberg is also displayed, reportedly used to store items belonging to her mother, Saint Elizabeth of Hungary. After the death of her husband, Landgrave Ludwig IV of Thuringia, in 1227, Elizabeth was forced to leave the Wartburg and became a nurse in a Franciscan hospital she had founded in 1229. She had to entrust her four-year-old daughter Gertrud to the care of Altenberg Monastery, under the direction of her confessor, Conrad of Marburg.

More potential relics of Saint Elizabeth, dating back to the 13th century, are housed in the adjacent Paraments Room. While it is impossible to verify whether the silver jug from which Elizabeth supposedly served wine to the sick or the ring—reportedly a gift from the Landgrave, with a large oval stone said to have shattered at the moment of his death—truly belonged to Elizabeth, these items fuel the historical narrative and legends surrounding Braunfels Castle.

The Altenberg Altar, dating from around 1330, is considered the work of an unknown master. This winged altar with Gothic tracery originally housed a Madonna and Child sculpture from the second half of the 14th century.

=== Princely Family Museum ===
The Princely Family Museum, located in the Long Building (accessible individually via coin-operated entry), contains additional collections of weapons and art, coins, medals, clothing, and a collection of Bohemian glass owned by the Princes of Solms. It also features a prehistoric section, the result of collaboration around 1815 between the 3rd Prince Wilhelm (1759–1837) and archivist Jakob-Carl Schaum, who was in frequent correspondence with Johann Wolfgang von Goethe.

One of the most curious finds is a fertility god from the 3rd millennium BC, unearthed in 1959 near Kraftsolms, of a type typically found in Asia Minor. Other family antiques include a collection of Meissen porcelain, Bohemian glass, sculptures, and silverware.

== The Castle Terraces ==
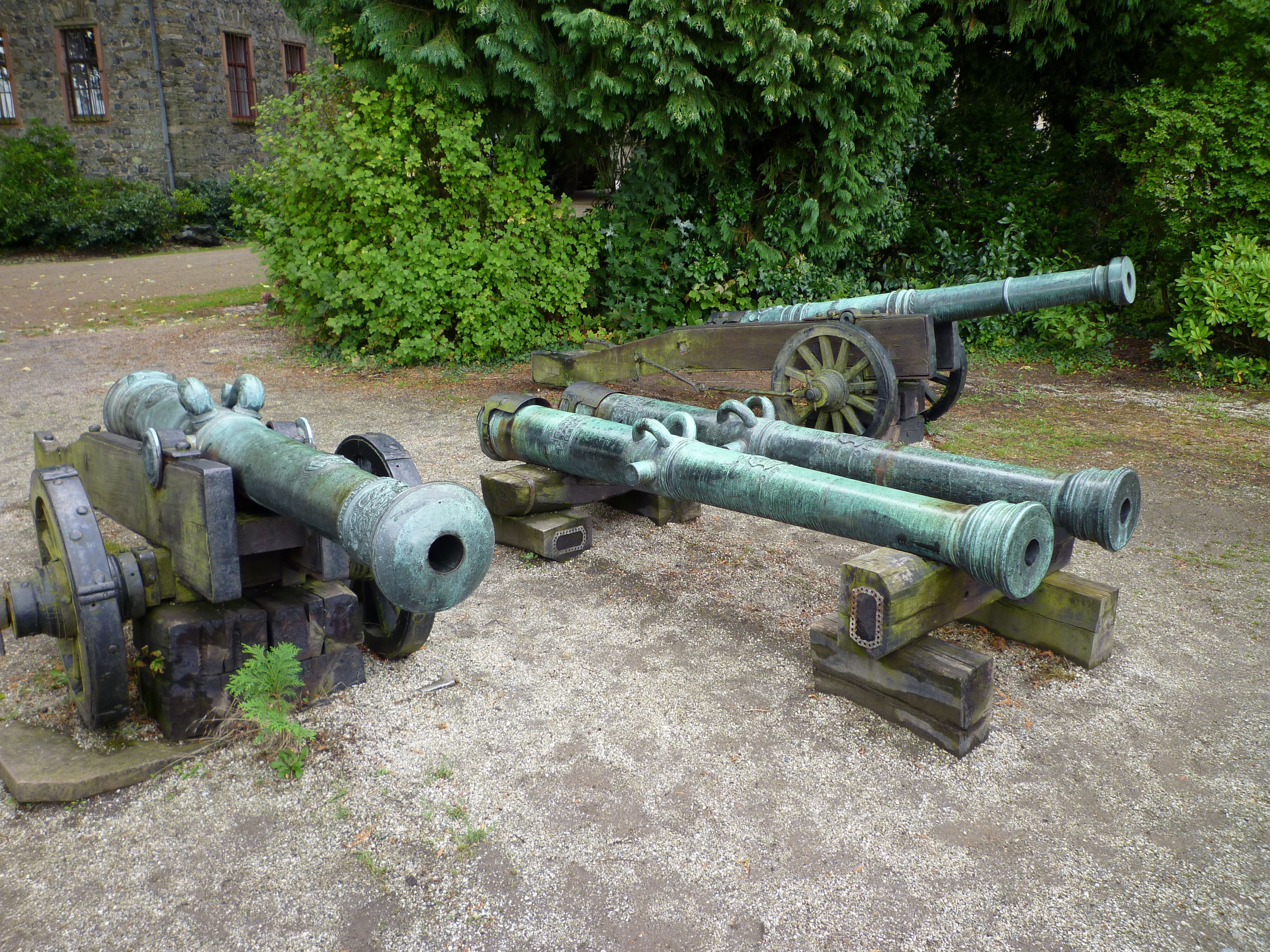
The bronze cannons at the terraces of Schloss Braunfels

To the north is the battery, where four bronze cannons from the 16th century are displayed. From the terrace, the view extends far to the southeast, beyond the old town of Braunfels and into the surrounding countryside.

== Park and Gardens ==
Nestled in a woodland and park landscape that extends widely to the north and west of the castle, there is a hilly and technically challenging 18-hole golf course, designed in 1971 by Bernhard von Limburger. The course features historic trees, and natural ponds serve as water hazards. The clubhouse is a renovated half-timbered building.

== Castle Church ==
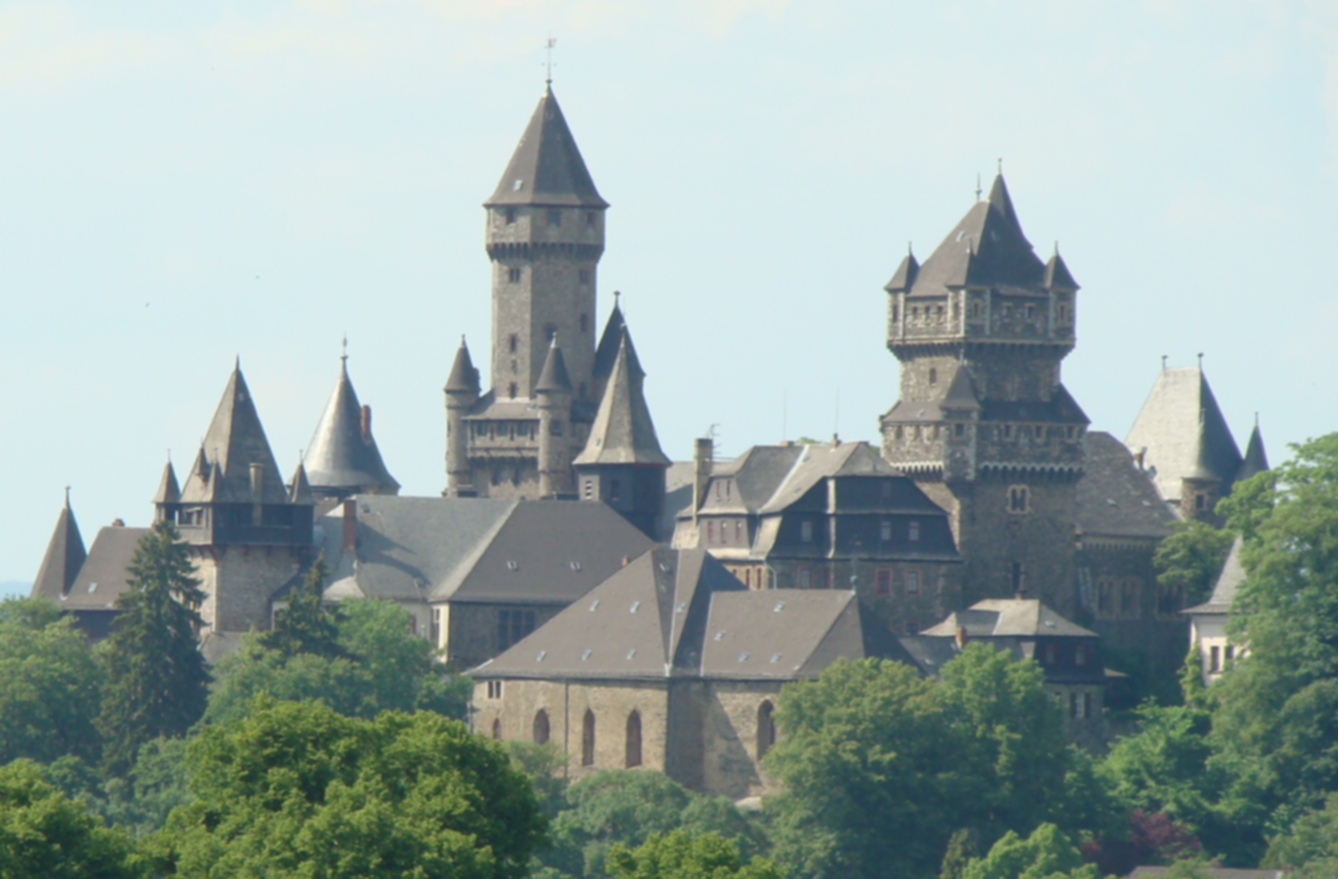
Braunfels Castle with the castle church

The Braunfels Castle Church (German: Schlosskirche Braunfels) is a late Gothic Hall church. Completed in 1501, the three-aisled church features a 3/8 choir and a sacristy attached to the north. Until 1883, it served as the burial place for the Counts and Princes of Solms-Braunfels. Due to its historical, artistic, urban, and scientific significance, the church is a cultural monument of Hesse. Today, it is part of the princely museum and is used by the Protestant congregation, and since the 1980s, occasionally by the Catholic community.

=== History ===
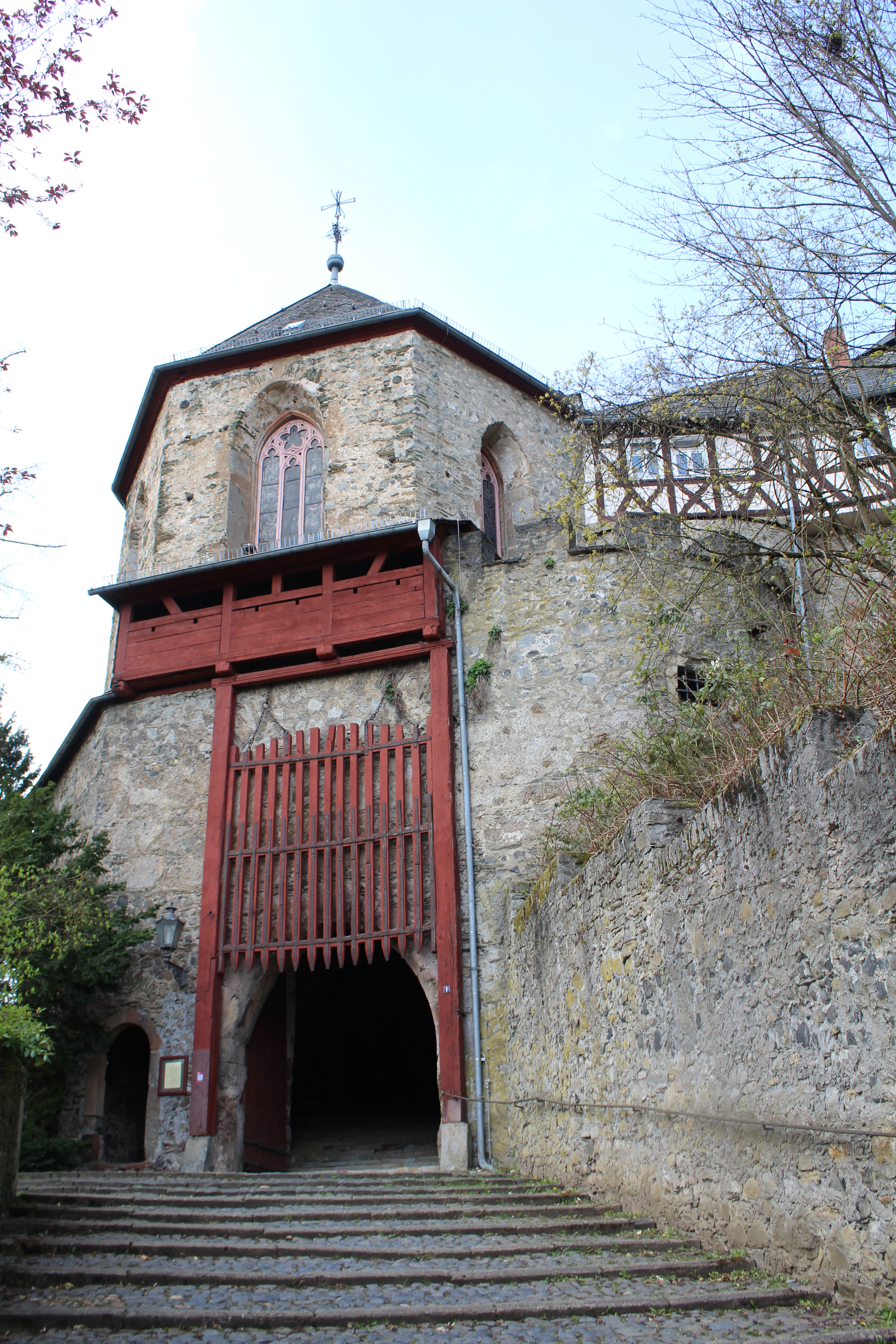
Entrance to Braunfels Castle with the castle church above

Bernhard II, Count of Solms-Braunfels (†1459), had a castle chapel built in Braunfels Castle in 1451, dedicated to Saint Gall. Its exact location is unclear; it may possibly be identified with the sacristy.

Count Otto II of Solms had a new church in the late Gothic style built between 1491 and 1501, replacing the previous castle chapel. For this, the oldest bailey below the 'Upper Gate' was vaulted, and the church was constructed on top of this vault. This type of externally visible sacred building over a bailey was used in the Middle Ages as a psychological deterrent against enemy attacks.

Originally, the church was equipped with five altars: dedicated to St. Anne, St. Mary, St. George, St. Sebastian, and St. Christopher, none of which remain today. The interior furnishings were altered several times over the years. Despite the castle fire of 1679, the structure of the castle church has been preserved in its entirety to this day. Under master builder Johann Ludwig Krieber, the roof was restored in 1679. It supported a bell tower, which was removed again in the mid-18th century. After 1679, the choir walls were paneled and fitted with cornices. The late Gothic terracotta tiles of the choir floor likely date from the 16th century.

In 1868, the interior of the castle church underwent extensive restoration, during which the current pews, choir stalls, and galleries were installed. The floor of the nave was paved with slabs of Lungstein. After a restoration of the choir area in 2016, the central and side aisles were renovated in 2018.

=== Architecture ===
The nave of the three-aisled hall church has a star vault, while the side aisles feature ribbed cross vaults that rest on four round columns with grotesque corbels as well as on the surrounding walls. Above the single-aisled choir, which has the 3/8 layout of an octagon, there is a net vault over heraldic stones; the earlier three arrow slits can still be seen on the south wall.

The original tracery of the windows is only preserved in the sacristy. The leaded glass windows currently present in the church were installed in 1902/04. The left choir window depicts the evangelists Luke and Mark, while the right shows John and Matthew. The large double window in the center of the choir depicts the Crucifixion scene.

The window behind the pastor's seat shows ornamental designs, with the cross in the center, surrounded by the crown of thorns and the Holy Scriptures featuring the letters A and O (‘Alpha’ and ‘Omega,’ Revelation 21:6, Luther Bible).

The church is accessed from the southwest through a niche entrance from the outer castle courtyard. The neo-Gothic portal was likely added around 1845.

=== Church Interior ===
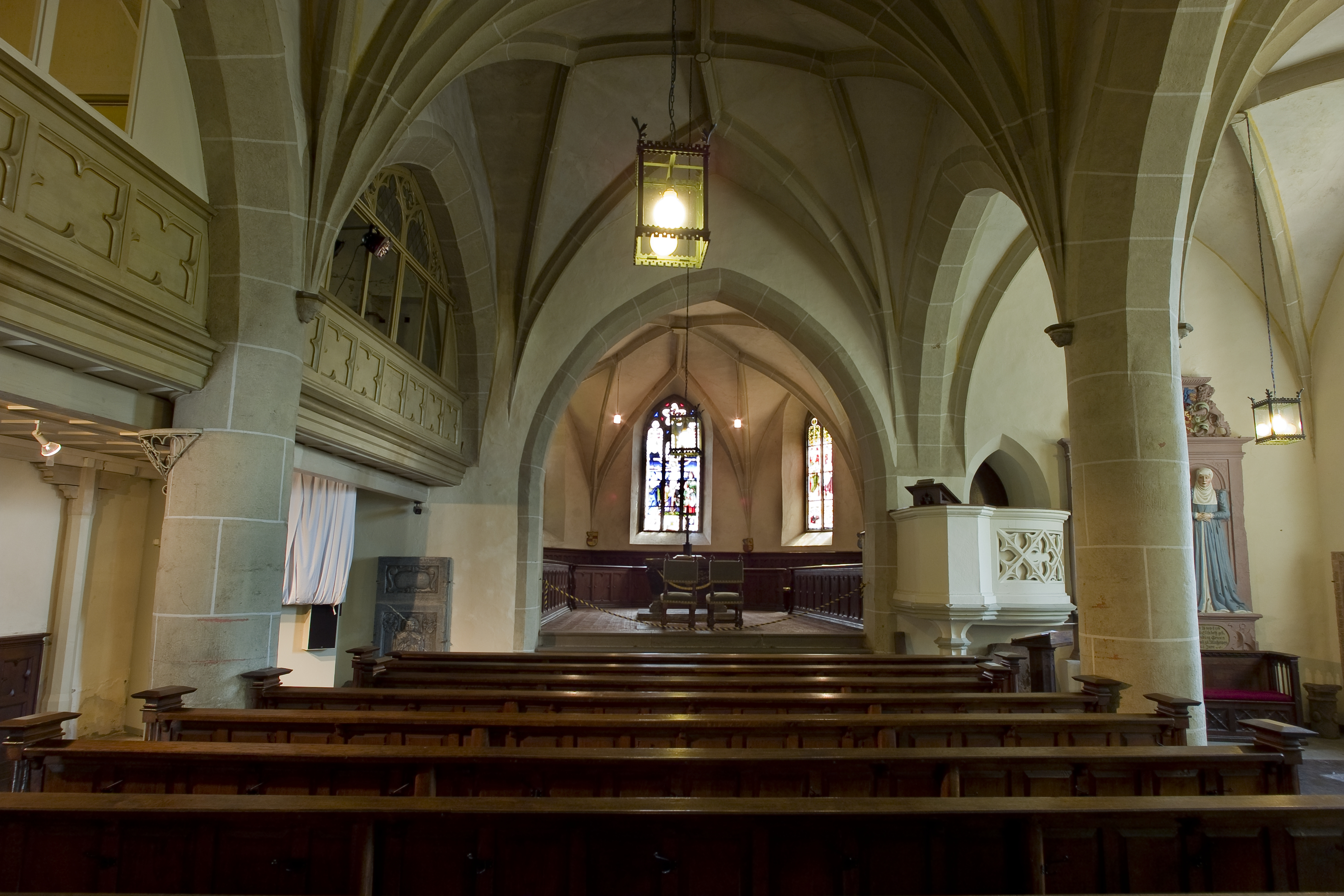
The interior of the Braunfels Castle church

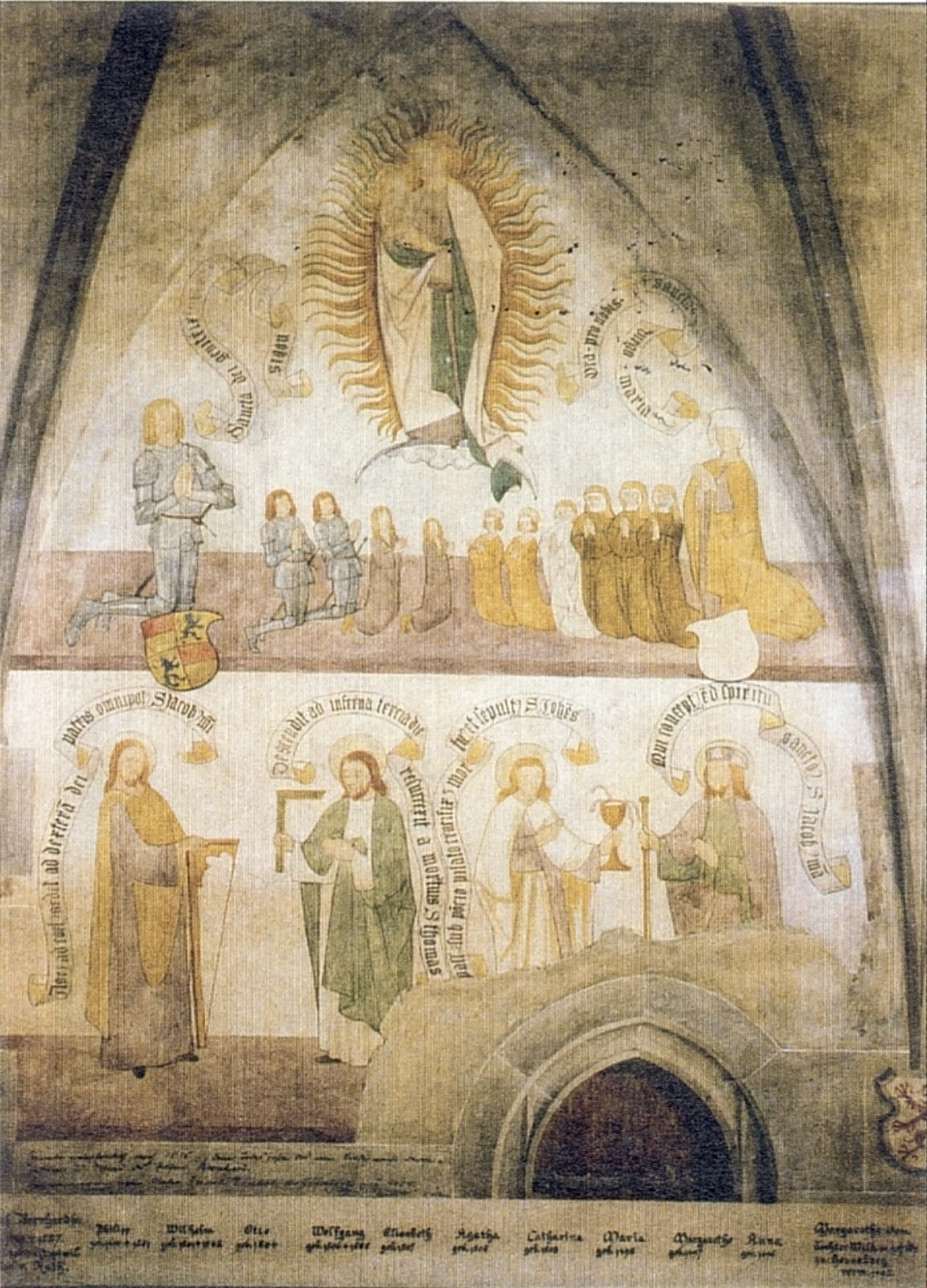
Frescos in the Braunfels Castle church

Originally, the church was adorned with rich paintings on the walls and vaults. Traces of Gothic vine patterns were discovered during the 1902 renovation. Due to their poor condition and lack of documentation, they could not be reconstructed and were painted over. The current interior painting is based on a design by building inspector Carl Seiler.

However, a relatively well-preserved votive painting was uncovered on the northern choir wall above the door to the sacristy. It likely dates from after 1515 and fills an entire vault bay. The painting depicts Count Bernhard III of Solms-Braunfels with his wife and children, kneeling beneath a Madonna (Mother of God, Mary with Child). In the lower part of the fresco, the apostles James the Younger, Thomas, John, and James the Elder are depicted with their attributes, beneath banners inscribed with the faith statements traditionally associated with each apostle.

The pulpit base was crafted during the late Gothic period. The galleries and church pews date from 1868.

The altar consists of a sarcophagus made of black Nassau Lahn marble. It was donated in 1785 by the 3rd Prince Wilhelm Christian of Solms-Braunfels and his two sisters, Auguste and Luise, for their parents Ferdinand and Sophie, who had been buried in the family vault beneath the choir in 1783 and 1772. On this occasion, the two coffins were moved from the vault and placed beneath two stone slabs made of blue marble in the choir, in front of the sarcophagus-altar.

=== Organ ===
In 1688, organ builder Grieb from Griedel constructed a new organ with ten stops. It was maintained in the 18th century by the Dreuth family of organ builders and sold to Kraftsolms in 1804. The current organ traces its origins to a small choir organ created by Johann Friedrich Syer between 1766 and 1768 for the Arnsburg Monastery. During the secularization, the instrument was transferred to Braunfels in 1804 and initially installed in the choir area. In 1900, Gustav Raßmann moved it to its current location in the gallery, built the neo-Gothic case with tracery, and expanded it to include a second manual. Sound adjustments and expansions were made in 1950 and 1965 by Raßmann's successor, Günter Hardt. The stops of the main work by Syer have been preserved. Overall, the organ has 21 stops across two manuals and a pedal.

=== Tombs ===
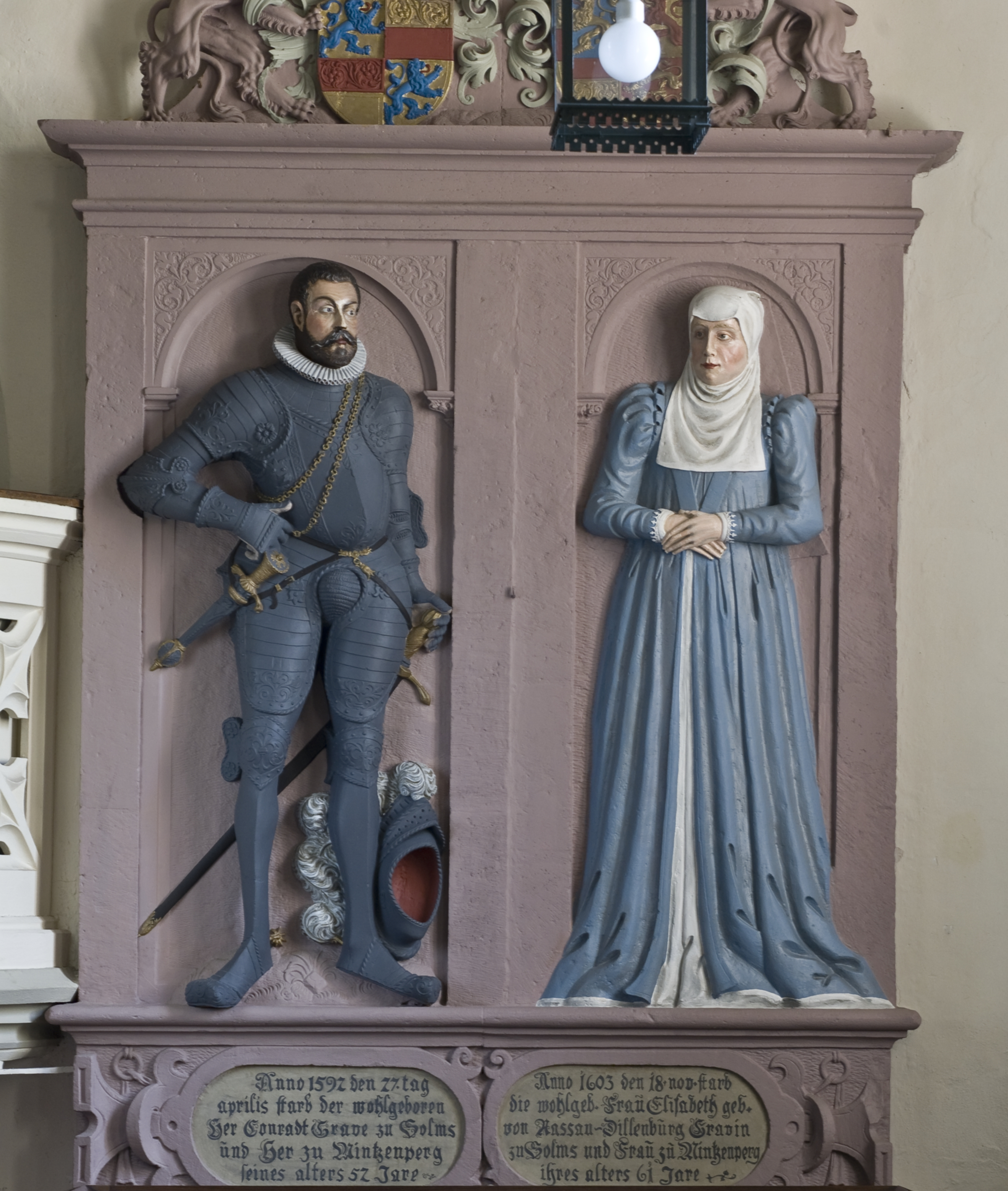
The colourful tomb of Count Conrad and his wife Elisabeth

On the east wall of the right side aisle, to the right beneath the pulpit, is the life-sized, richly designed, and colorful tombstone of Count Conrad of Solms-Braunfels (1540–1592) and his wife Elisabeth, née Countess of Nassau-Dillenburg (1542–1603). In the shallow niches of the tombstone, he is depicted dressed as a German knight, in accordance with the fashion of the time, with a sword at his left side and a dagger at his right. At his feet is a helmet with an open visor, symbolizing his noble status. Elisabeth stands to his left, wearing a modest convent dress, whose folds are considered a particularly well-executed work by the unknown artist. The current coloration dates back to 1985.

To the right of the parents' tombstone, midship on the southern exterior wall of the church, is a richly carved wooden epitaph from 1587, decorated with fittings and coats of arms, dedicated to one son and four daughters of Count Conrad and Elisabeth, who died in childhood from smallpox.

Between the tombstone of the count couple Conrad/Elisabeth and the wooden epitaph for their children stands the life-sized stone tombstone of Count Wilhelm of Solms-Braunfels (1501–1542), son of Count Bernhard III. Wilhelm died in 1542 in Eferding, Austria, from wounds sustained in battle against the Turks. This tombstone is also a late Gothic sculptural work, showing the influence of Stephan Rottaler.

The origin and connection to the House of Solms of a stone slab standing to the left in front of the altar are unclear. It commemorates two children of Wolfgang Ehrenreich von Borschittaw and his wife Magdalena Catharina, née von Angern, who died young.

=== Reformation and use of the Church ===
Count Philipp of Solms-Braunfels (1494–1581) introduced the teachings of Martin Luther in the Braunfels region. Until 1582, the Braunfels community belonged to the Lutheran parish of Altenkirchen in the County of Nassau-Dillenburg. With the introduction of the stricter Reformed doctrine, Count Conrad separated Braunfels from the Lutheran Altenkirchen in 1582, established an independent parish there, built a rectory, equipped the parish with property and revenues, and opened the castle church to the now Reformed community in 1583, which had previously attended St. George's Church.

The synodal order introduced in 1582 with Count Conrad's conversion to the Reformed faith essentially remained in place until 1739. However, during the Thirty Years' War, the castle changed hands four times between 1621 and 1635, accompanied by religious oppression of the population and corresponding changes in the use of the castle church. It was not until the arrival of the Swedes in March 1632 that the state of unrest came to an end, and since then, the castle church has been continuously the official church of the Braunfels Evangelical-Reformed parish. The princes and counts of Braunfels continued to exercise their rights as patrons of the Protestant community in Christian fellowship, even after the house returned to Catholicism in 1950.

In 1980, the Evangelical congregation of Braunfels built a new church building further down in the town, near the Catholic St. Anna Church, which had been established since the mid-19th century. By withdrawing from the sole use of the castle church as the only Protestant parish church in the town, the way was opened for an expanded usage in cooperation with the Catholic Christians, who also have their own parish church. With a presbytery resolution in 1985 and subsequent contractual arrangements with the castle owner, the continued possibility of the Evangelical congregation using the castle church was established.

In the following years, the church space was increasingly used for exhibitions and concerts, as well as for weddings of local residents and guests from outside the area. In 2005, the Catholic Church, through the Diocese of Limburg in consultation with the Evangelical Church and the castle owner, granted permission for the celebration of Holy Mass and weddings according to the Catholic rite. With this approval for Catholic use of the castle church in addition to the ongoing Protestant use for certain occasions, there is now a form of joint usage in Braunfels. Since then, both denominations have utilized the opportunity to hold their own services in a shared church building.

== Literature ==
- Losse, Michael (2007). Burgen und Schlösser an der Lahn. Von Biedenkopf und Marburg über Gießen, Wetzlar und Weilburg bis Limburg, Nassau und Lahnstein (in German). Petersberg: Imhof Verlag. pp. 69–74. ISBN 978-3-86568-070-9.
- Graf von Oppersdorff Solms-Braunfels, Johannes; Schlagetter-Bayertz, Peter (2009). Schloss Braunfels (in German). Braunfels. ISBN 978-3-939609-66-7.
- Schellenberg, Karl-Heinz (1990). Braunfelser Chronik (in German). Braunfels: Magistrat der Stadt Braunfels.
- Schellenberg, Karl-Heinz (1982). Schloss Braunfels – Große Baudenkmäler (in German). Vol. 309. München: Deutscher Kunstverlag.
- Schellenberg, Karl-Heinz (1974). Schloss Braunfels im Naturpark Hochtaunus (Institut für Naturschutz. Schriftenreihe.) (in German). Darmstadt: Verlag Institut für Naturschutz. ISSN 0416-7465.
- Schlagetter-Bayertz, Peter (1992). "Streifzug durch die Geschichte von Schloss Braunfels". Heimatjahrbuch für das Land an der Dill im Lahn-Dill-Kreis (in German). Vol. 2. pp. 245–260. ISSN 0939-5180.
- Schlagetter-Bayertz, Peter (1996). "Schloss Braunfels: Gestalt und Darstellungen im Wandel der Zeiten". Heimatjahrbuch für das Land an der Dill im Lahn-Dill-Kreis (in German). Vol. 6. pp. 41–52. ISSN 0939-5180.
- Schlagetter-Bayertz, Peter (1997). "Schloss Braunfels: 150 Jahre Rittersaal". Heimatjahrbuch für das Land an der Dill im Lahn-Dill-Kreis (PDF) (in German). Vol. 40. pp. 279–289. ISSN 0939-5180.
- Schlagetter-Bayertz, Peter (2010). "Die Türme und Türmchen von Schloss Braunfels". Heimatjahrbuch für das Land an der Dill im Lahn-Dill-Kreis (in German). Vol. 53. pp. 212–224. ISSN 0939-5180.
- Seiler, Carl (1936). Schloss Braunfels einst und jetzt. Ein Führer durch 8 Jahrhunderte (in German). Braunfels: Fürst zu Solms-Braunfels'sche Verwaltung.
