= Braunfels =

- Town
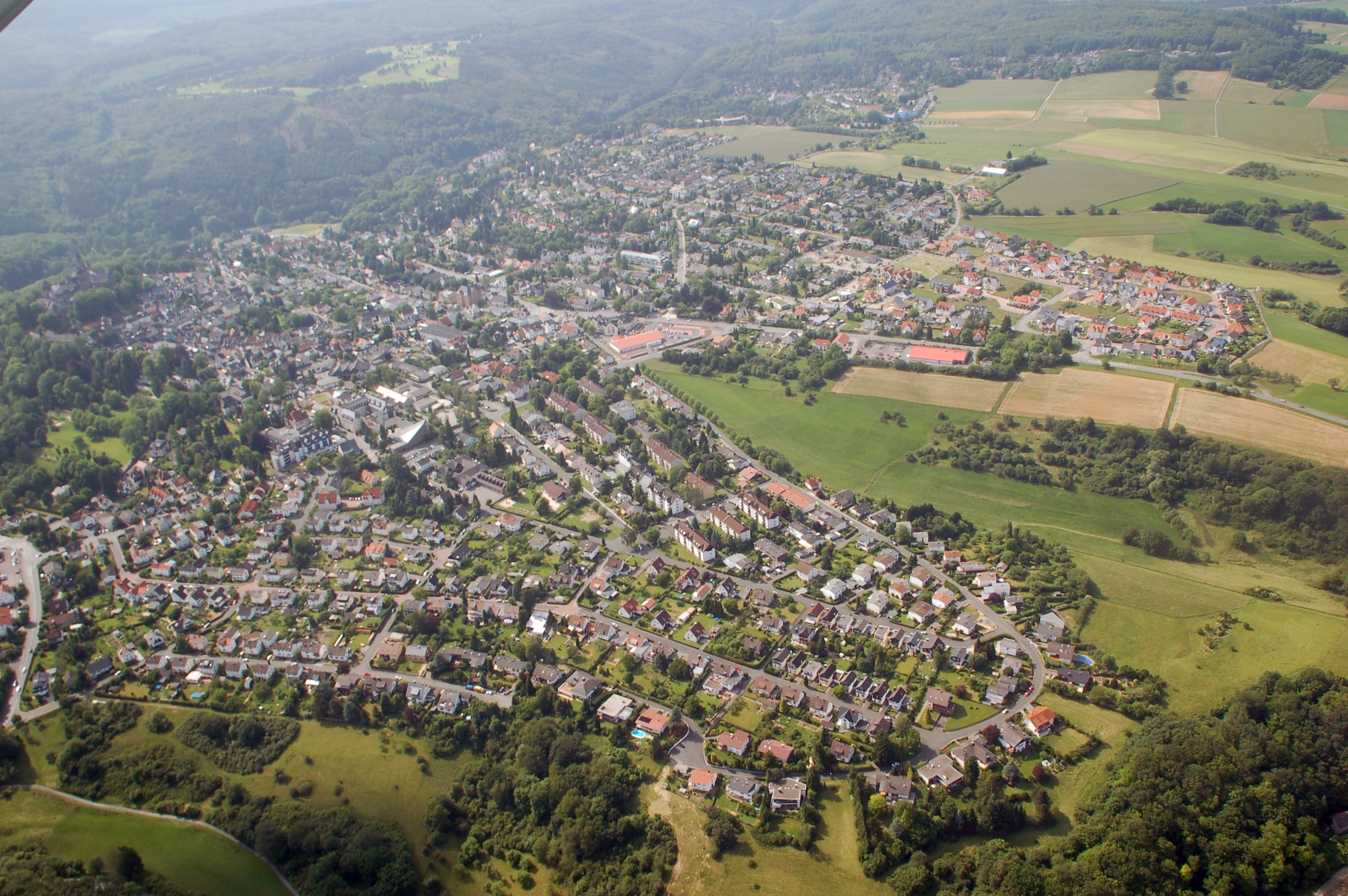
- Aerial view

- Coat of arms

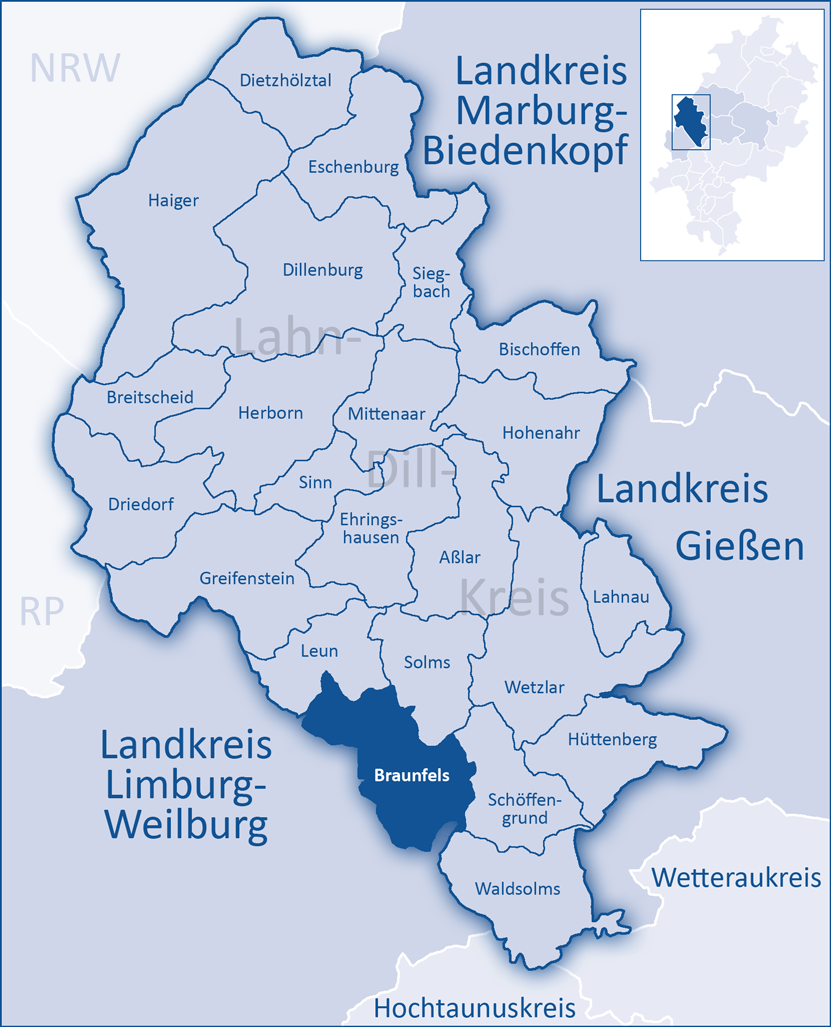
- Location of Braunfels within Lahn-Dill-Kreis district
- Interactive map of Braunfels
- Location within Germany Location within Hesse
- Coordinates: 50°31′N 8°23′E
- Country: Germany
- State: Hesse
- Admin. region: Gießen
- District: Lahn-Dill-Kreis
- Subdivisions: 6 Stadtteile

Government
  - Mayor (2018–24): Christian Breithecker

Area
  - Total: 47.28 km^{2} (18.25 sq mi)
- Elevation: 236 m (774 ft)

Population (2025-12-31)
  - Total: 11,148
  - Density: 235.8/km^{2} (610.7/sq mi)
- Time zone: UTC+01:00 (CET)
  - Summer (DST): UTC+02:00 (CEST)
- Postal codes: 35619
- Dialling codes: 06442
- Vehicle registration: LDK
- Website: www.braunfels.de

Braunfels (German pronunciation: [ˈbʁaʊnfɛls]) is a town in the Lahn-Dill-Kreis in Hesse, Germany. It is located on the German Timber-Frame Road.

== Geography ==
=== Location ===
The climatic spa of Braunfels lies at a height of some 100 m above the Lahn valley. It is 9 km southwest of Wetzlar, and 28 km northeast of Limburg an der Lahn.

Braunfels borders in the northwest on the town of Leun, in the north on the town of Solms, in the east on the community of Schöffengrund, in the southeast on the community of Waldsolms (all in the Lahn-Dill-Kreis), in the south on the community of Weilmünster, and in the west on the town of Weilburg and the community of Löhnberg (all three in Limburg-Weilburg).

=== Constituent communities ===
Besides the main town, which bears the same name as the whole, there are outlying villages called Altenkirchen, Bonbaden, Neukirchen, Philippstein and Tiefenbach.

Currently, Bonbaden, is home to about 1600 people. Bonbaden has a primary school (levels 1-4) and an Evangelical and Catholic church. A cultural highlight is the Freilichtbühne Bonbaden (Bonbaden Open-Air Stage), which presents two different plays for children each summer, and an evening play for adults.

== History ==
The town and district seat of Braunfels were first mentioned in 1246. Braunfels has had town rights since 1607. In 1950 Braunfels had a population of 3,337. In the course of municipal reforms, the aforesaid constituent communities, formerly all independent villages, were amalgamated with Braunfels in 1972.

Bonbaden had its first documented mention in 772, and so celebrated 1200 years of existence in 1972. Bonbaden is therefore one of Lahn-Dill's oldest inhabited places.

Braunfels Castle, a stately home that had been built from a castle built in the 13th century by the Counts of Nassau, served as of about 1260 as the Solms-Braunfels noble family's residential castle. After Solms Castle had been destroyed by the Rhenish League of Towns in 1384, Braunfels Castle became the seat of the Counts of Solms. Over the castle's more than 750-year-long history, building work was done many times. Particularly worthy of mention is the town and castle fire of 1679, which destroyed much of both; the castle was rebuilt into a Baroque residence, while the town was given a regular marketplace, which is still preserved today and lies before the town wall.

== Politics ==
=== Town council ===
The municipal elections on 14 March 2021 yielded the following results:

| | 2021 | 2016 |
| CDU | 14 seats | 14 seats |
| FWG/FDP | 9 seats | 8 seats |
| SPD | 8 seats | 11 seats |
| Greens | 6 seats | 4 seats |

Note: FWG is a citizens' coalition.

=== Coat of arms ===
The town's coat of arms is the same as that used by the Counts of Solms-Braunfels, except that the colours in the lower half are reversed, simply to differentiate the town's arms from the old noble family's. The arms were designed and granted in 1937, and granted again on 14 October 1982. Formerly, the arms were identical to the Counts' arms.

=== Town partnerships ===
Braunfels maintains partnerships with the following towns:

- Bagnols-sur-Cèze, France
- Eeklo, Belgium
- Feltre, Italy
- Kiskunfélegyháza, Hungary
- (United States) New Braunfels, Texas, USA
- Newbury, England
- Rohrmoos-Untertal, Austria
- Carcaixent, Spain

== Sightseeing ==
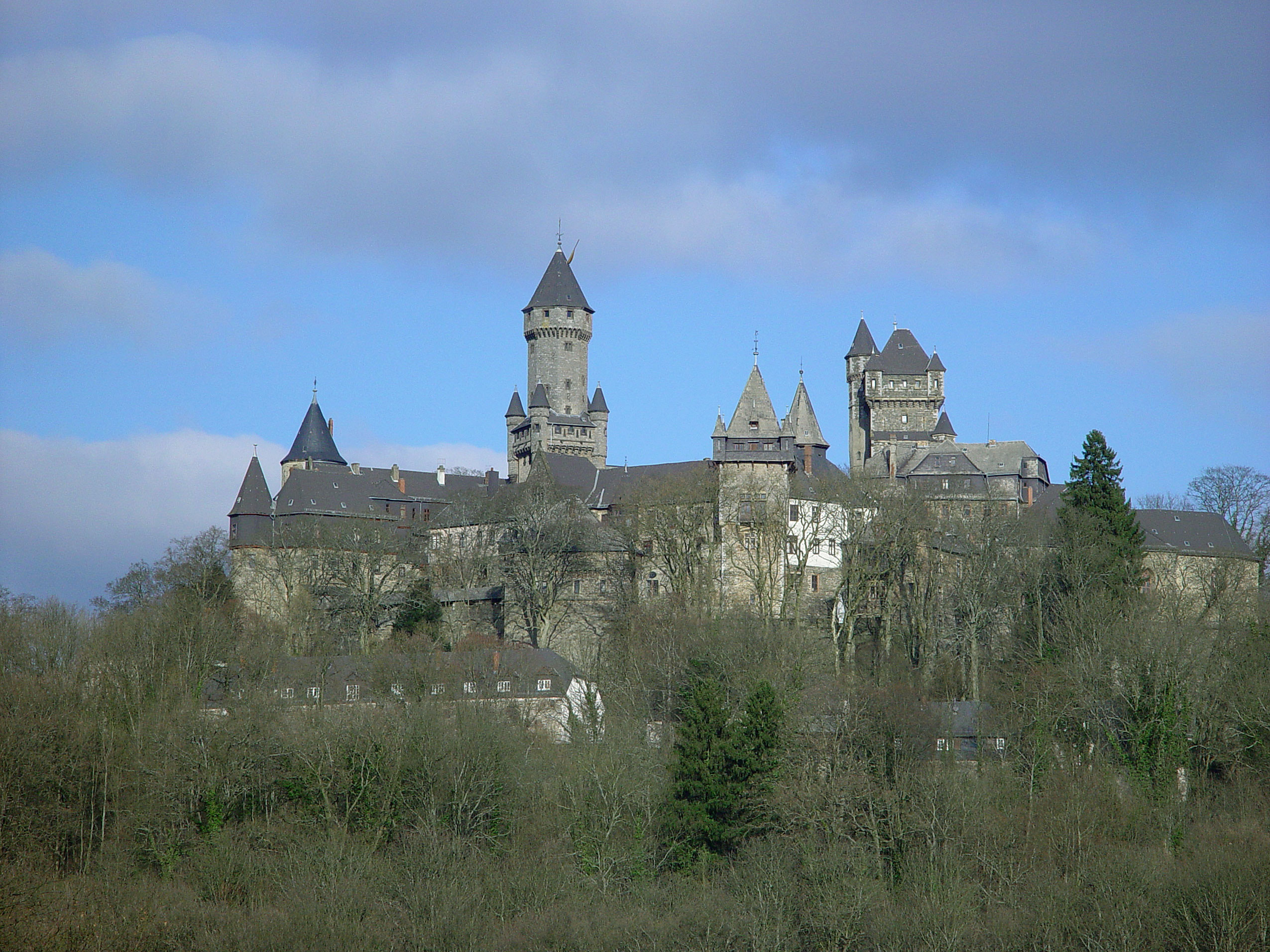
Braunfels Castle

- Braunfels Castle: The last makeover, which defines the Schloss as it is seen today, took place starting in 1880, and was undertaken according to neo-Gothic plans by builder Edwin Oppler. Art works in the Schloss include works by the Dutch Masters, among them van Eyck, works by the Hessian Tischbein family of painters, the Altenberg Altar, parts of which are found in the Städel in Frankfurt and the Bavarian National Museum in Munich, and Saint Elizabeth's legendary ring. Sites in the castle include the courtyard, the knights' hall, the guest rooms and painting gallery, the sacral exhibition pieces from the Altenberg Monastery, the hunting paintings by Johannes Deiker, and the cannon square. Other things to visit are the Princely Family Museum and the castle church with displays about the church's building history.
- Old Town: The inner Old Town has distinctive defensive features. There are a Baroque expansion with a marketplace and great spa gardens.
- Dr. Kanngießer'sches Waldmuseum (a whimsical museum)
- Stadtmuseum Obermühle, a museum of local history, built in a former mill.
- Burg Philippstein: These castle ruins lie on a slope and are separated from the surrounding mountainside by a dry moat, although nowadays this is partly filled in. Still preserved are the round keep, remains of the cellar and parts of the surrounding wall.

=== Mediaeval Spectacle ===
Every year, the local Aktionsring Braunfels e.V. organizes the Mittelalterliches Spektakulum, which over several days attracts tourists, and showmen, for which occasion, the spa gardens are turned into a knightly encampment.

== People ==
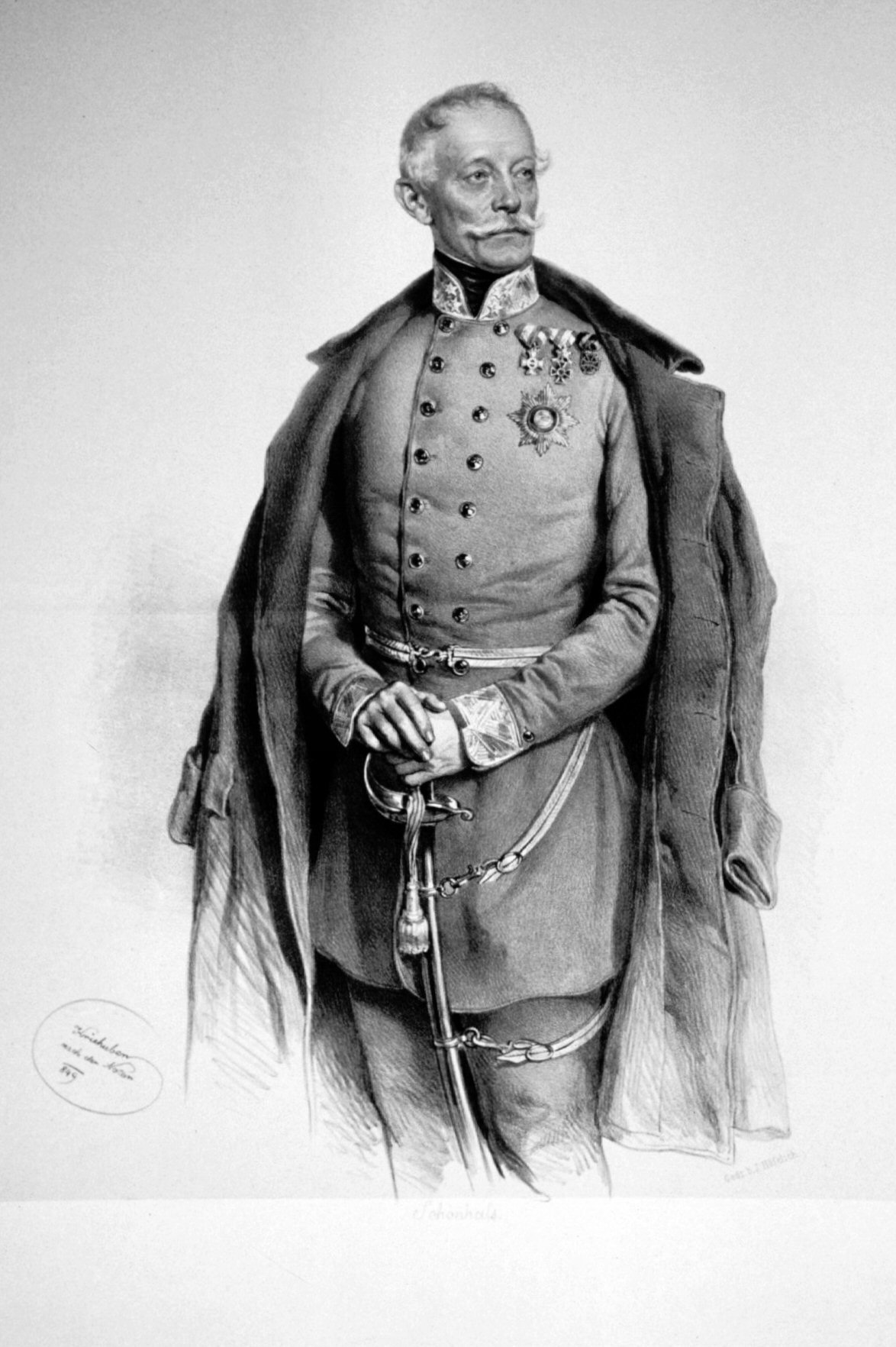
Karl von Schönhals 1849

- Amalia of Solms-Braunfels (1602-1675), Countess of Solms-Braunfels, wife of Frederick Henry, Prince of Orange
- Frederick IV, Landgrave of Hesse-Homburg, Landgraf of Hesse-Homburg (1724-1751)
- Karl von Schönhals (1788-1857), Austrian general in the Napoleonic Wars
- Friederike Fliedner (1800-1842), nurse and teacher, cofounder of the Women's deaconate
- Karl of Solms-Braunfels (1812-1875), Prince of Solms-Braunfels, Commissioner-General of the Adelsverein, founder of New Braunfels, Texas.
- Ewald von Kleist (1881-1954), officer, Second World War field marshal
- Ottmar Gerster (1897-1969), composer, conductor and viola player
- Vanessa Jean Dedmon (born 1987), singer
