= Karl von Schönhals =

Austrian historian (1788–1857)

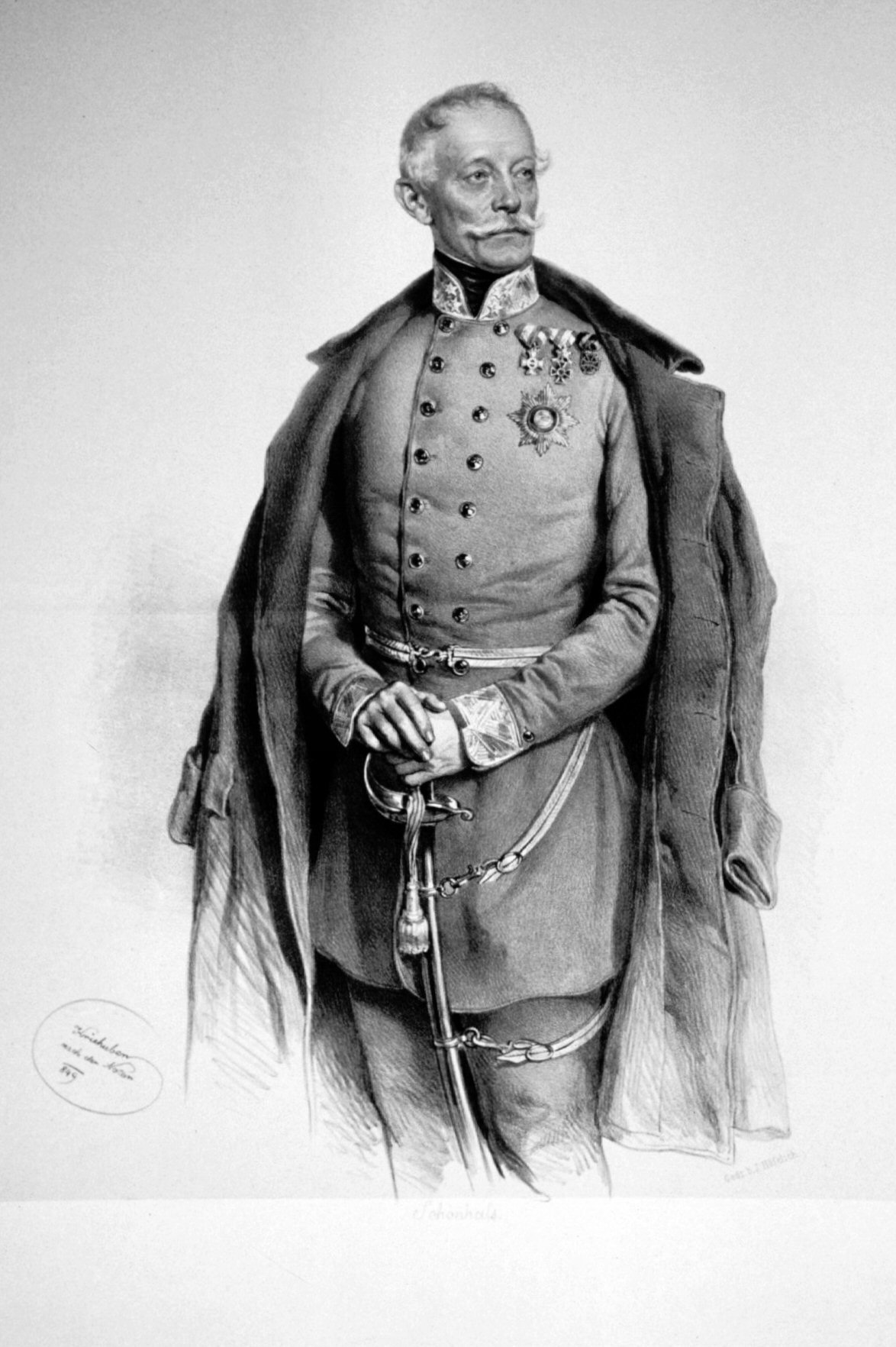
Karl von Schönhals; Lithograph by Joseph Kriehuber 1849

Karl Ritter von Schönhals (15 November 1788, Braunfels, Solms-Braunfels - 16 February 1857, Graz) was an Austrian general.

== Life ==
Schönhals entered the army in 1807, joining an Austrian Jäger regiment, and was badly wounded at the battle of Aspern and battle of Dresden. In 1821 he joined the Naples expedition, in 1830 he acted as general-adjutant to General Frimont in Milan and in as 1832 general-adjutant to Radetzky. In 1838 he was promoted to major general and in 1848 to Feldmarschallleutnant.

In the dangerous times of 1848 he did a great service to the Austrian army. In 1849 the Provisional Central Government of the German Confederation in Frankfurt am Main was dissolved and replaced by plenipotentiaries for Austria and Prussia, with Schönhals and Karl Friedrich Kübeck Freiherr von Kübau representing the Austrian Empire until the commission was dissolved and parliament restored.

Starting in 1851, he resigned due to his war wounds, at the rank of Feldzeugmeister, and devoted himself to writing biographies and military history. He lived in Graz, where he was looked after by his sister Henriette Schönhals. His tomb is located in the Protestant cemetery of St Peter in Graz.

== Honours ==
- Knight's Cross of the Order of Leopold - 1838
- Knight's Cross of the Military Order of Maria Theresa - 19 August 1848, along with promotion to the rank of knight, his name thereafter being Karl Ritter von Schönhals.
- Order of the Iron Crown - 1849
- Wirklicher Geheimer Rat - 1849
- Number 16 of the personalities of the Italian campaign 1848–1849 on the Gedenkstätte Heldenberg

== Works ==
1) Published under his own name:

- Aphorismen aus der Kriegskunst, 2 Teile, 1820 und 1821;
- Einige Betrachtungen über die Verwendung der stehenden Heere, 1820.
- Biographie des K.K.Generals der Kavallerie und Hofkriegspräsidenten Grafen von Frimont, 1833.

2) Published anonymously :

- Erinnerungen eines österreichischen Veteranen aus dem italienischen Kriege in den Jahren 1848 und 1849, Stuttgart 1852, 2 Bde.; 7. Aufl. 1853;
- Biographie des Feldzeugmeisters J. Freiherr von Haynau, 3. Aufl., Graz 1853;
- Der Krieg 1805 in Deutschland, Wien 1874.

== Bibliography ==
- Schönhals, Karl Ritter von in Constant von Wurzbach, Biographisches Lexikon des Kaiserthums Oesterreich, 31st Volume, page 157, Wien, k. k. Hof- und Staatsdruckerei 1876
- http://www.biographien.ac.at/oebl_11/81.pdf
- http://de.wikisource.org/wiki/ADB:Sch%C3%B6nhals,_Karl_Freiherr_von
- L. Weißbart: C. Eine Rückschau auf sein Leben und Wirken zur 150. Wiederkehr seines Geburtstages. In Heimat im Bild. Beilage zum Gießener Anzeiger. Jahrgang 1938, Nr. 45, pp. 177-180 and Nr. 46, pp. 183–184.
