= Schadow =

Schadow is a surname. Notable people with the surname include:

- Johann Gottfried Schadow (1764–1850), German sculptor
- Rudolph Schadow (1786–1822), German sculptor, son of Johann
- Friedrich Wilhelm Schadow (1789–1862), German painter, son of Johann

Schadow is also the former German name for the town of Šeduva, Radviliškis District Municipality, Lithuania.
