= Nike Instructs the Boy in Heroic History =

Sculpture in Berlin, Germany

- Nike lehrt den Knaben Heldensagen (German)
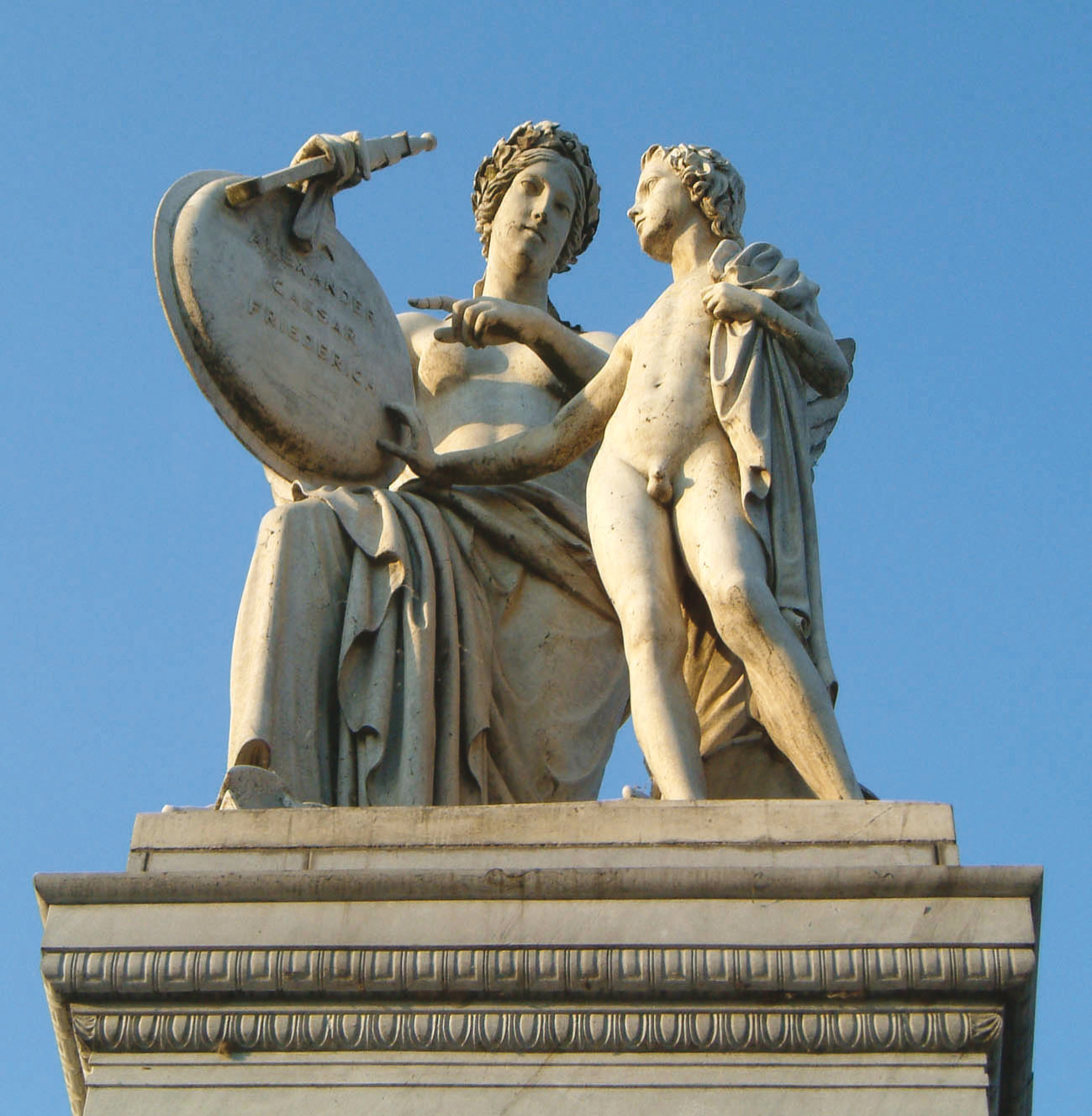
- The sculpture in 2003
- Artist: Emil Wolff
- Type: Sculpture
- Subject: Nike
- Location: Berlin, Germany; 52°31′03″N 13°23′54″E

Nike Instructs the Boy in Heroic History (German: Nike lehrt den Knaben Heldensagen) is an outdoor sculpture by Emil Wolff, installed on Schlossbrücke in Berlin, Germany.
