= Princesses Monument =

18th-century sculpture by Johann Gottfried Schadow

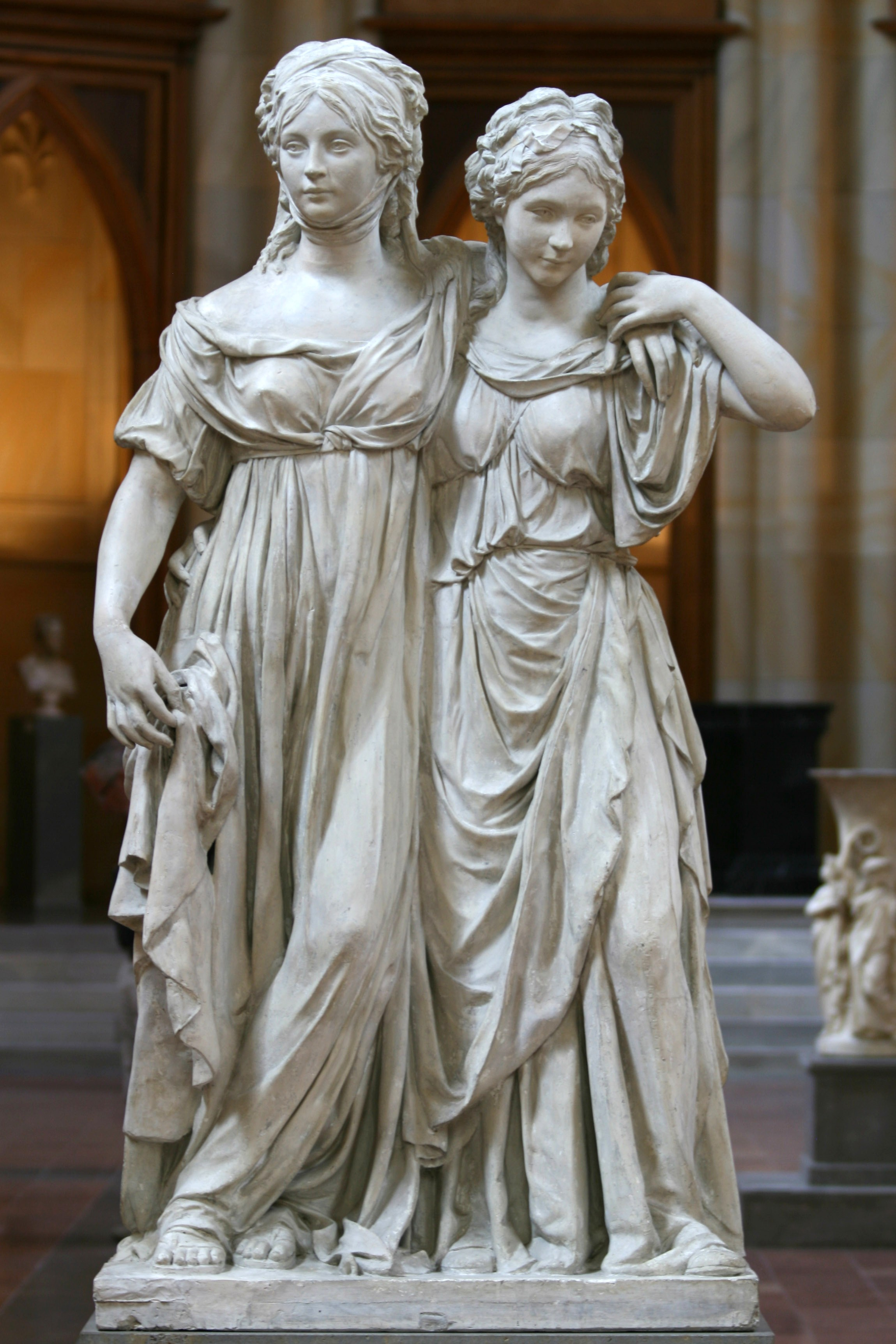
Original plaster version

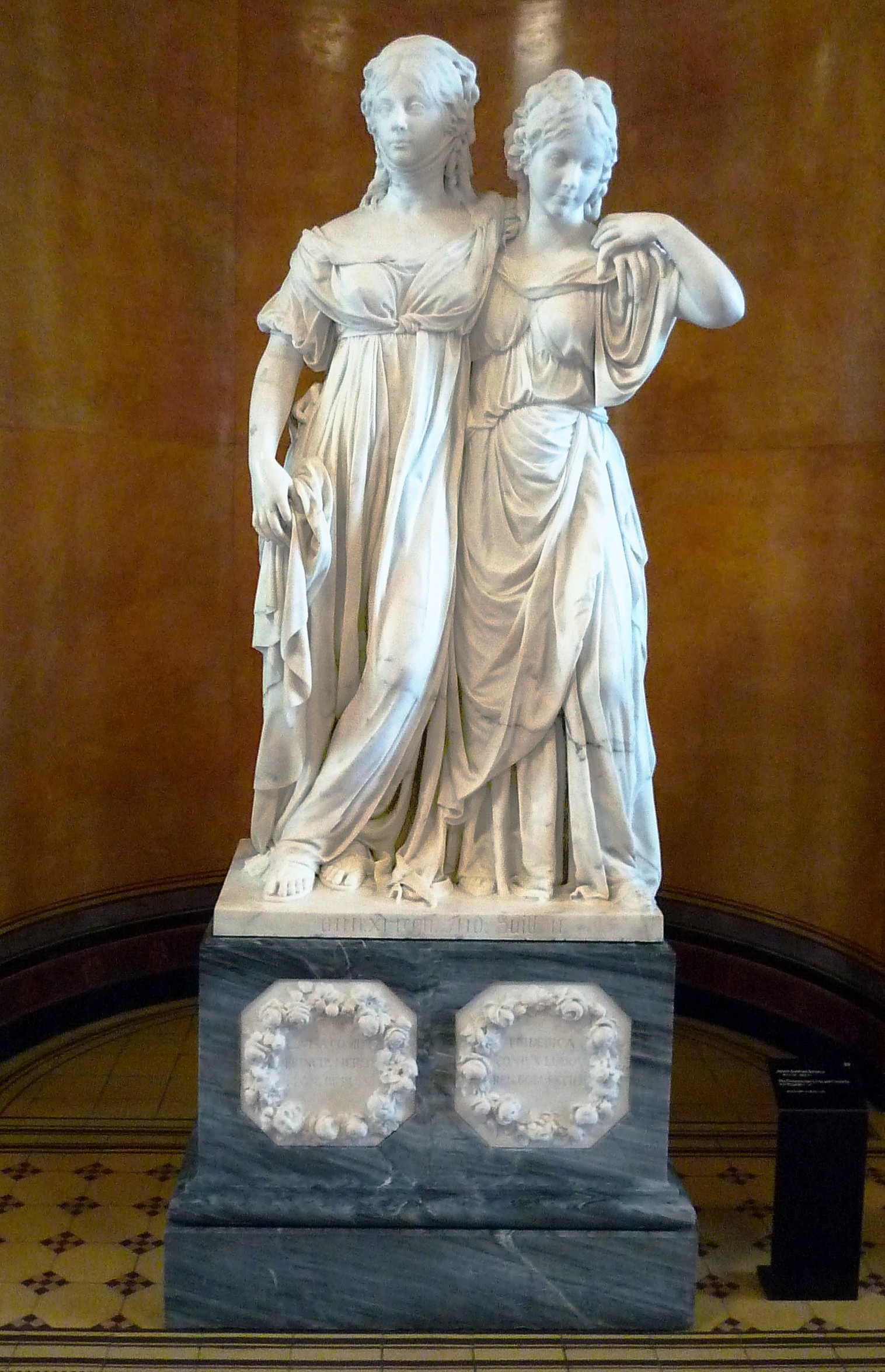
Original marble version

The Princesses Monument (German: Prinzessinnen-Denkmal) or Princesses Group (Prinzessinnengruppe) is a sculpture by the German artist Johann Gottfried Schadow showing the sisters Louise and Frederica, princesses of Prussia. Schadow first produced busts of the sisters and then between 1795 and 1797 produced the full-length life-size group, initially in plaster and then in marble. The initial plaster version now stands in the Schinkelmuseum whereas the original marble group is in the Alte Nationalgalerie.

Artists and the public praised the work, but it was criticised by Louise's husband and fell into neglect for ninety years. It is now held to be a masterwork of early Berlin neoclassicism alongside the same artist's quadriga for the Brandenburg Gate (1793).

== Historical context ==
On 24 December 1793 crown prince Frederick William III married Princess Louise of Mecklenburg-Strelitz in the Berlin Palace. Two days later at the same place his younger brother Prince Louis married Princess Friederike, Louise's younger sister.

King Frederick William II was so impressed by the beauty and youthful charm of his new daughters-in-law, who were 17 and 15 years old at that time, that he asked Schadow to portray them in sculptures.

== Portrait busts ==
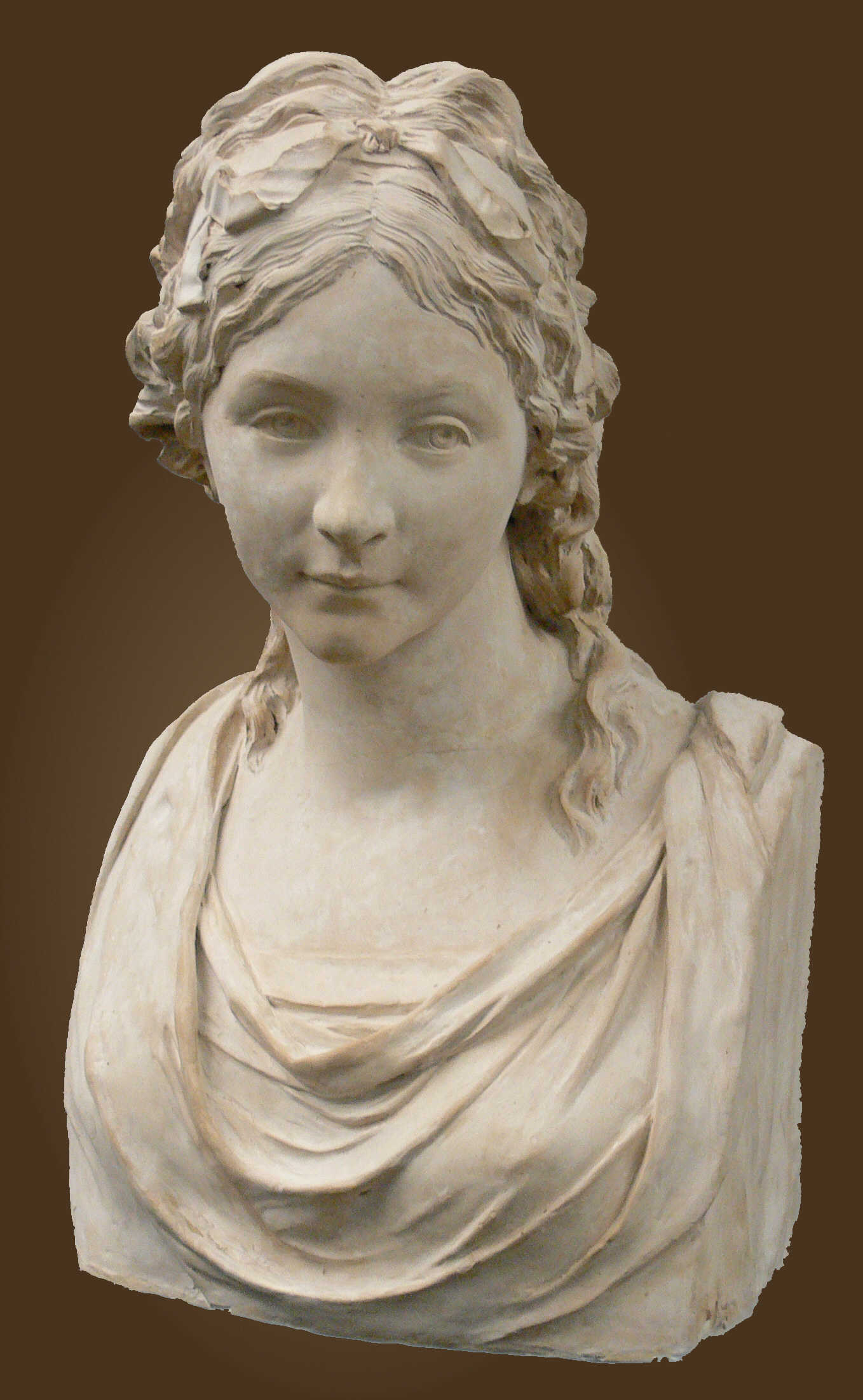
Portrait bust of princess Frederica

The deliverable of the command initially was a pair of portrait busts in clay. To facilitate the modelling sessions, Schadow was given a room in a wing of the Kronprinzenpalais (Berlin) where the crown prince and his wife resided when they were in Berlin. Friederica and Prince Louis lived in a neighbouring building. She often came for modelling sessions. The contacts with Louise were more distant and the artist often had to be content to attend audiences given by the crown prince and his wife.
