= Friedrich Wilhelm Schadow =

German painter (1789–1862)

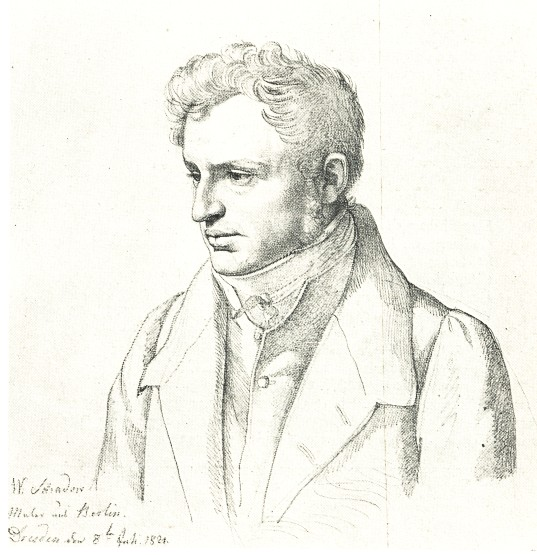
- Friedrich Wilhelm Schadow by Carl Christian Vogel von Vogelstein (1821)
- Born: 7 September 1789; Berlin, Kingdom of Prussia
- Died: 19 March 1862 (aged 72); Düsseldorf, Kingdom of Prussia, German Confederation
- Known for: painting

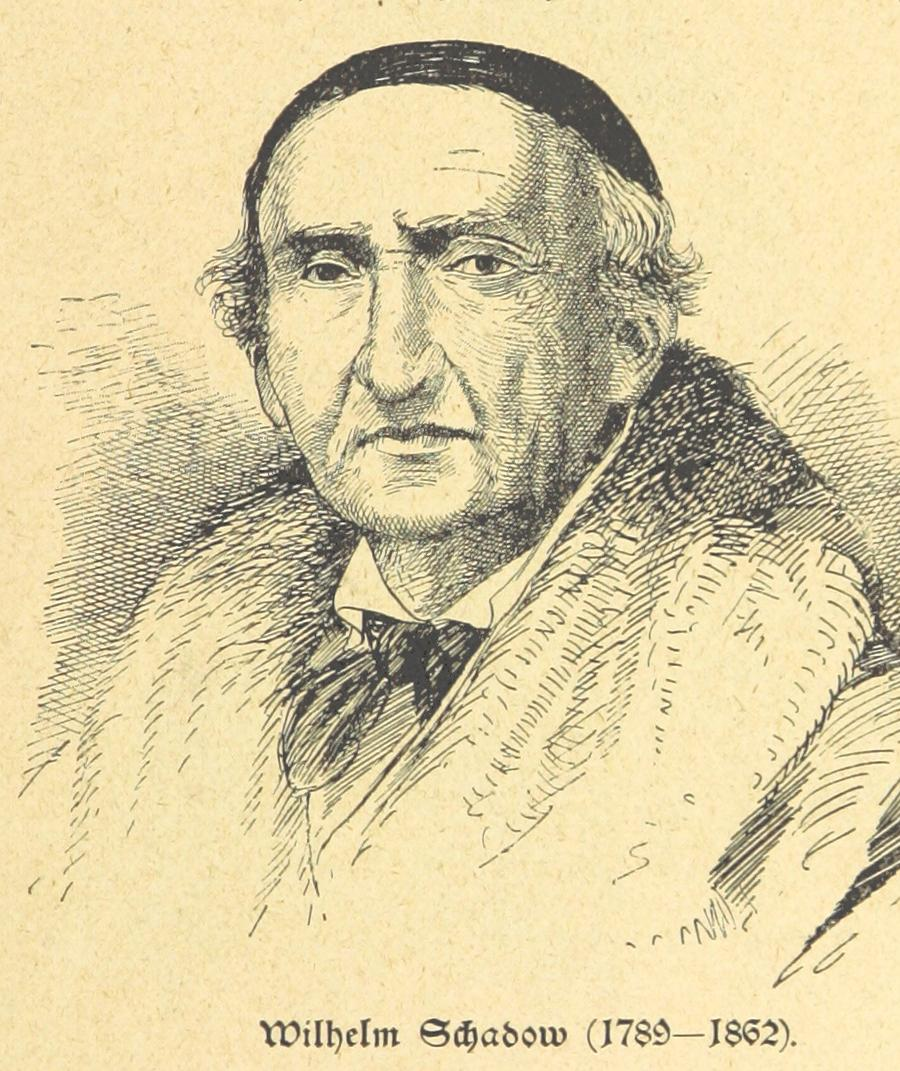
Illustration from Hundert Jahre in Wort und Bild

Friedrich Wilhelm von Schadow (7 September 1789 – 19 March 1862) was a German Romantic painter.

== Biography ==
He was born in Berlin, the second son of the sculptor Johann Gottfried Schadow, who gave him his first lessons in drawing. He then turned to painting, and was instructed by Weitsch.

In 1806-7 Schadow served as a soldier. In 1810 he traveled with his elder brother Rudolph to Rome where he became one of the leading painters of the Nazarene movement. Following the example of Johann Friedrich Overbeck and others, Schadow, originally a Lutheran, joined the Roman Catholic Church, and held that an artist must believe and live out the truths he essays to paint. The sequel showed that Schadow was qualified to shine more as a teacher and mentor than as a painter. As an author, he is best known for his lecture, Ueber den Einfluss des Christentums auf die bildende Kunst (About The Influence of Christianity On The Visual Arts) (Düsseldorf, 1843), and the biographical sketches, Der moderne Vasari (Berlin, 1854).

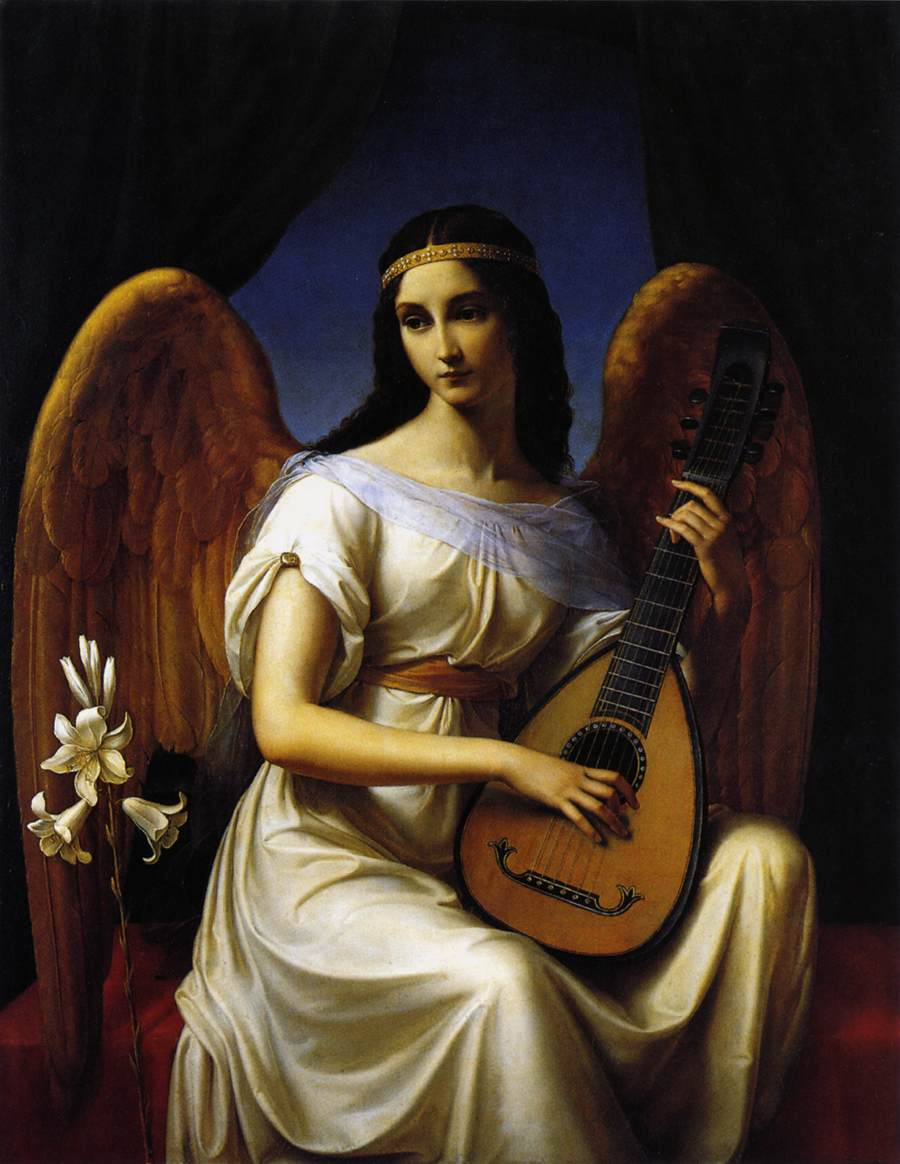
Mignon (1828)

In Rome, Schadow was given one of his first major commissions when the Prussian Consul-General, General Jakob Salomon Bartholdy, befriended the young painter, and asked him and three young compatriots (Peter von Cornelius, Johann Friedrich Overbeck and Philipp Veit) to decorate in fresco a room in his house on the Pincian Hill. The overall theme selected was the story of Joseph and his brethren, and two scenes, the Bloody Coat and Joseph in Prison, were conferred on Schadow. In 1819, Schadow was appointed professor in the prestigious Berlin Academy of the Arts, and his ability and thorough training gained many devoted disciples.

It was during this period that Schadow developed his paintings for churches. In 1826 he was made director of the Kunstakademie Düsseldorf which he reoriented towards the production of Christian art, though he began a major dispute with one of its professors, Heinrich Christoph Kolbe, ending in the latter leaving the Academy in 1832. In 1837, Schadow selected, at request, those of his students best qualified to decorate the chapel of St Apollinaris on the Rhine with frescoes. When finished, they were acclaimed as the fullest and purest manifestation of the spiritual side of the Düsseldorf school. One of his famous students, Heinrich Mucke, carried on the liturgical art with emphasis both in painting and frescoes. The painting of the Wise and Foolish Virgins, considered one of his masterworks, was commissioned in 1842. Now in the Städel Museum, this large and important picture, while carefully considered and rendered, lacks the power of some of his other works.

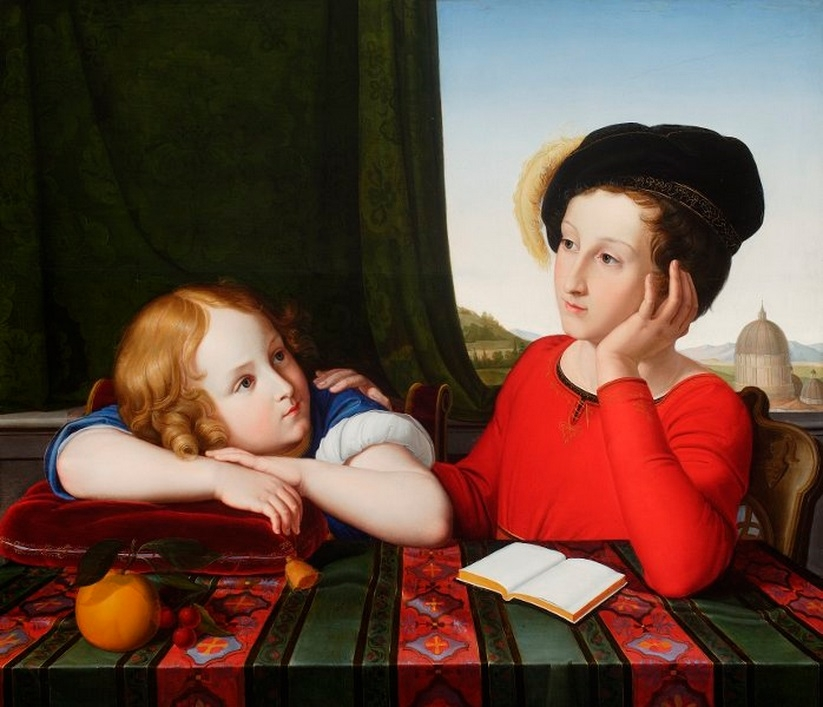
Wieńczysław and Konstanty Potocki in Childhood (1820)

Schadow's fame rests less on his own artistic creations than on the school he formed. In Düsseldorf a reaction set in against the spiritual and sacerdotal style he had established and, in 1859, the party of naturalism, after a severe struggle, drove Director Schadow from his chair. He died at Düsseldorf in 1862, and a monument was erected in the square which bears his name at a jubilee held to commemorate his directorate.

The Düsseldorf School that Schadow directed became internationally renowned, attracting such American painters as George Caleb Bingham, Eastman Johnson, Worthington Whittredge, Richard Caton Woodville, William Stanley Haseltine, James M. Hart, and William Morris Hunt and producing the German emigre Emmanuel Leutze.
