= Harry Maitey =

First Hawaiian in Prussia, Germany

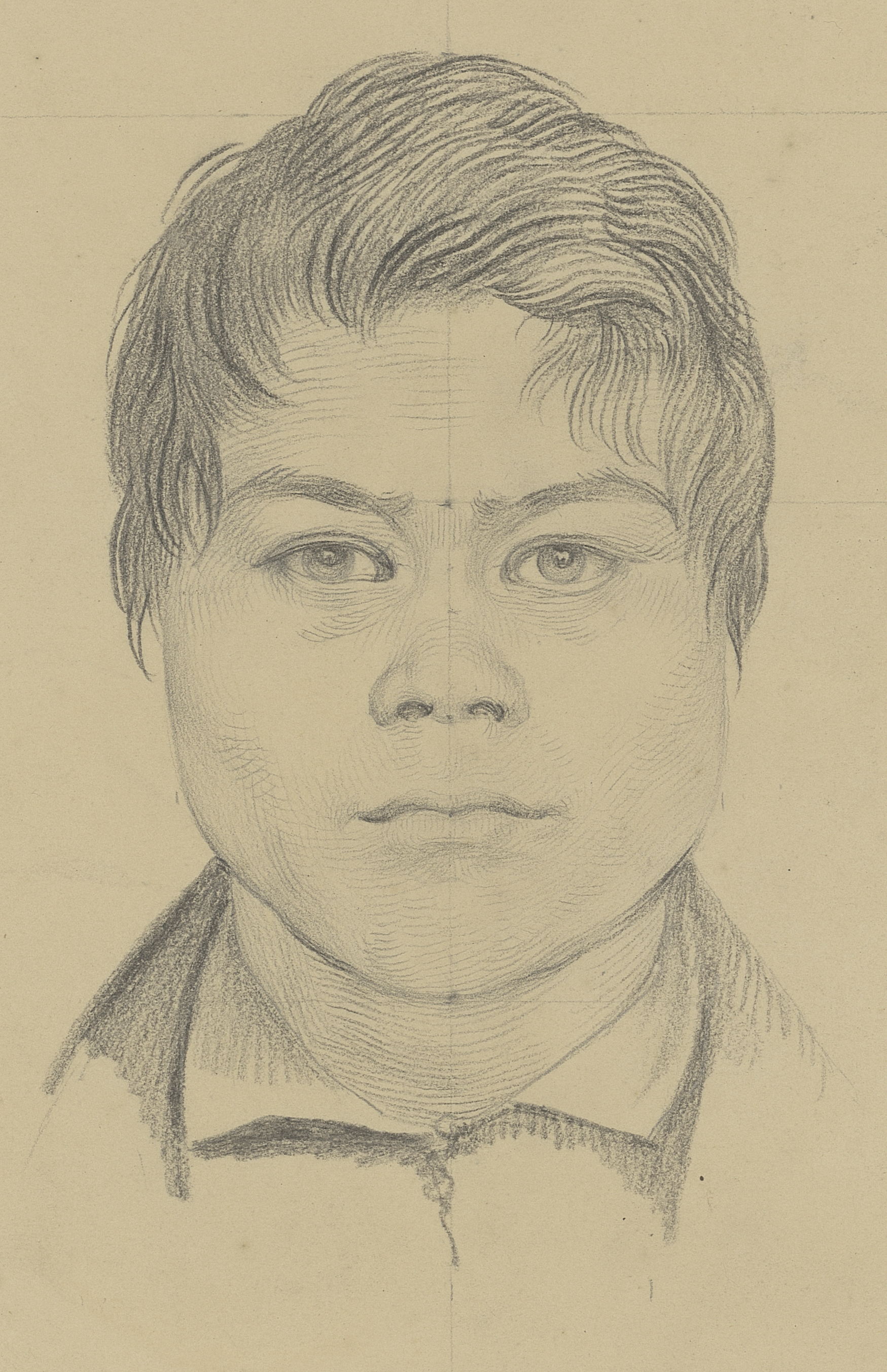
Drawing by Johann Gottfried Schadow, chalk and graphite, October 26, 1824 (Detail)

The name Harry Maitey was given by Germans to a Native Hawaiian (April 23, 1807 – February 26, 1872), who was the first Hawaiian in Prussia, Germany. According to the records of Wilhelm von Humboldt, he stated Teoni as his father's name and Bete as his mother's. He married Dorothea Charlotte Becker from Stolpe on August 28, 1833. Their son Heinrich Wilhelm Otto (born December 2, 1837) and his younger sister Friederike Wilhelmine (born in 1846) died as infants, while their second son Heinrich Wilhelm Eduard (born December 8, 1839, died 1906) survived his parents. His daughter Martha (born 1869), Maitey's only grandchild attaining adulthood, remained unmarried.

== Biography ==
=== Early life ===
There is little known about Maitey's life in Hawai‘i. The information about his Hawaiian name Kaparena seems to have no confirmation from other sources. When the Prussian frigate Mentor arrived in Honolulu on November 28, 1823, the French whaler L'Aigle had left the harbour the day before with the Hawaiian king Liholiho and his queen Kamamalu. Chiefs from other islands gathered on Oʻahu while the king was absent, and also the death of Keoua, the governor of Maui, caused an atmosphere of political uneasiness. It is unknown, if this situation urged Maitey to plead to be taken aboard of the Mentor, the first Prussian ship both to circumnavigate the globe as well as visiting Hawai‘i. Inquiries about the Hawaiian teenager confirmed that he had no relatives, and he was allowed to leave Hawai‘i. The name Maitey was recorded by the Germans as Henry's (or Harry's) family name, but was obviously derived from the Hawaiian maika‘i or maita‘i.

=== Journey to Prussia ===
During the voyage the ownership of the ship was transferred to the Seehandlungsgesellschaft (Prussian Maritime Enterprise) under the jurisdiction of the Prussian king Frederick William III. Therefore, after the arrival of the Mentor in Swinemünde on September 14, 1824, the king was informed about the Sandwich islander, and decided on September 27, that the president of the Seehandlungsgesellschaft, Christian Rother, should bring him to Berlin. Maitey stayed in Rother's house there until the king decided on October 15, that he had to be educated in the German language and the principles of Christianity.

=== Education ===
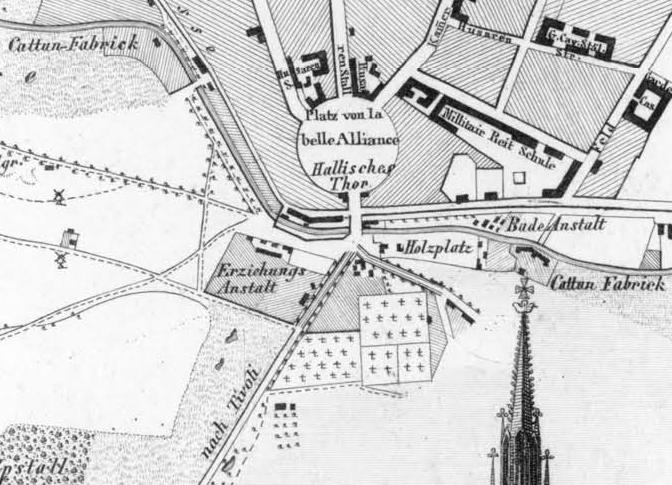
Map showing the Erziehungs-Anstalt outside the Gate to Halle (1848)

Maitey continued to live with the family of president Rother until 1827, when he moved to the Erziehungshaus vor dem Halleschen Tor, a school institution he had attended since 1825. In 1827 Maitey was invited to meet Wilhelm von Humboldt for conversations about the Hawaiian language, the result of which Humboldt presented first in the Berlin Academy of Sciences in 1828. Based on these conversations the Sandwich-Wörterverzeichnis (Sandwich glossary) served as foundation of his research on the Malayo-Polynesian languages and Maitey was Humboldt's most important source for the Hawaiian language.

From fall in 1829, he had a Hawaiian companion in the Erziehungshaus for about eight months, Jony Kahopimeai, who had come to Germany with the Prussian ship Princess Louise. After Maitey started to serve at Peacock Island Jony occasionally visited him, but in February 1831 he became ill, died from pneumonia and was buried on March 2, 1831.

=== Service at Peacock Island ===
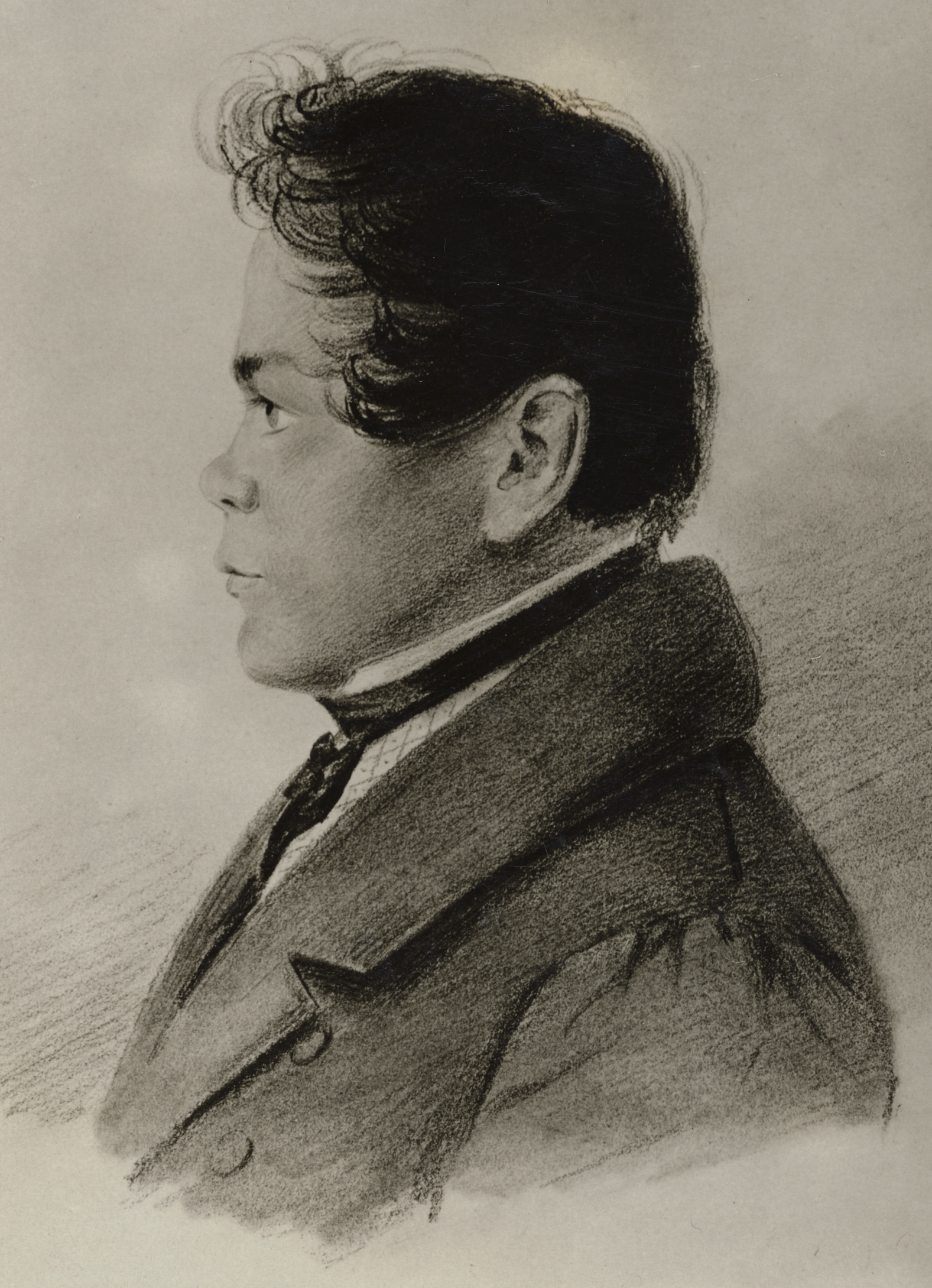
Harry Maitey, ca. 1850

On April 23, 1830, Maitey was baptized and confirmed. He was given the German names Heinrich Wilhelm at the christening. In August Maitey was taken over by the royal household and assigned as assistant to the engine master at Peacock Island (German: Pfaueninsel). He was listed as a ward of the king and assistant to the engine master. However, it is documented that there was also a suggestion, that Maitey should become the ferryman of Peacock Island, but obviously his final assignments were a much better perspective for him.

In summer 1834, two Hawaiian geese (nēnē), which were brought to Germany on the ship Princess Louise as well, arrived also on the island.

The engine master Franciscus Joseph Friedrich trained Maitey as wood turner, locksmith, and cabinetmaker.

After some difficulties Maitey got the royal marriage consent with help from Christian Rother, and married Dorothea Charlotte Becker on August 25, 1833, in the church of Stolpe. After the wedding the couple moved to Klein-Glienicke, therefore Maitey had to travel to Peacock Island for work. Later he was more and more absent, which created difficulties for his relationship with Friedrich. Finally it was decided, that Maitey was assigned to the royal Garten Inspector Fintelmann.

While working under master Friedrich, Maitey apparently helped him building miniature replicas of famous castles and cathedrals from ivory and mother-of-pearl. The part of his carving skills seemed to be essential, because it was stated later, that Friedrich did not make the models anymore after Maitey left as his assistant. It is also suggested that Maitey was the artist who created some yellow room dividers in the castle, which were attributed to Friedrich as well.

== Late years and descendants ==
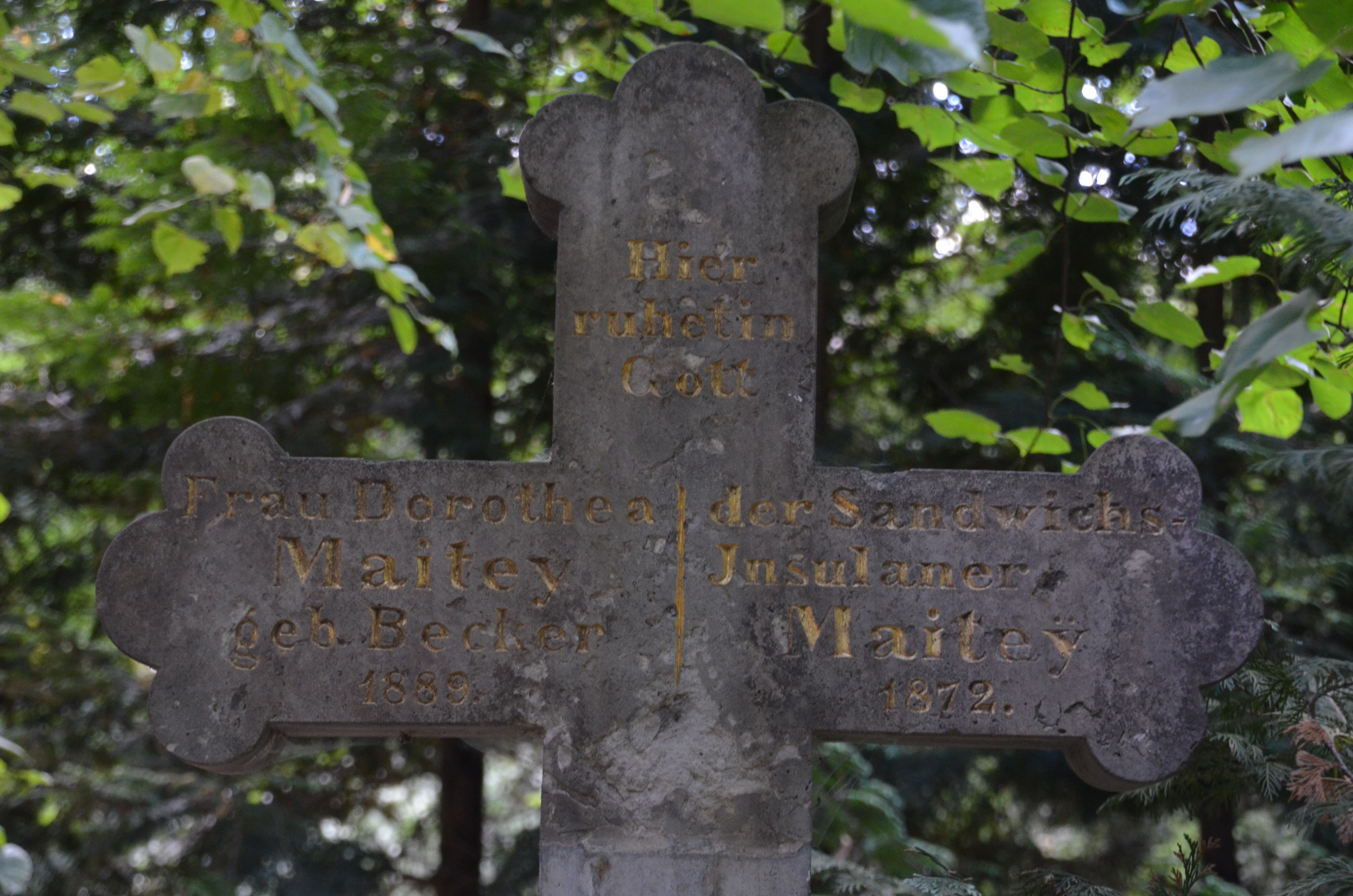
Grave of Harry Maitey: inscription for himself and his wife

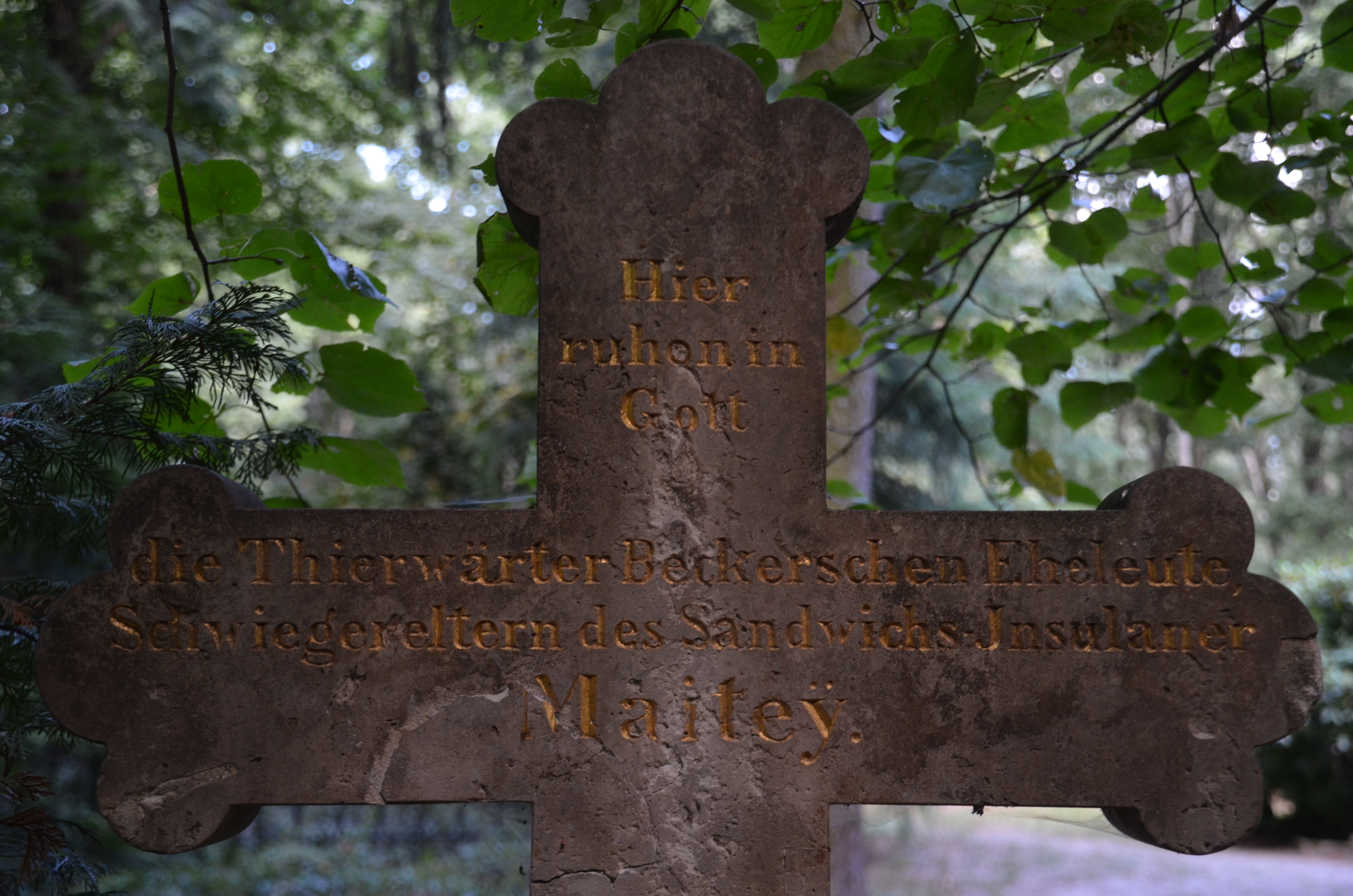
Grave of Harry Maitey: inscription for his in-laws

Living in Klein-Glienicke (Kurfürstenstraße 10) for the rest of his life, Maitey died of smallpox at his home on February 26, 1872, "a pensioner of the king, at the age of sixty-four." His grave still exists at a small cemetery not far from the church Ss. Peter and Paul at Nikolskoe near Peacock Island and is also the final resting place of his wife and his in-laws:

Here rest in God the Sandwich Islander Maitey, 1872, and his wife Dorothy Becker Maitey, 1889
Here rest in God the animal keeper Becker and his wife. They are the in-laws of the Sandwich Islander Maitey

Inscriptions on the cross at the grave

Maitey's son Eduard believed, that his father was a Hawaiian prince, which was doubted by Caesar von der Ahé who published articles about Maitey in 1930 and 1933. Von der Ahé mentioned the name Kaparena as probably Maitey's Hawaiian name, but there are no such records in the Prussian documents. He also referred to files of the former Prussian court when he wrote, that Maitey's father was a soldier in Hawai‘i.

It is unknown, if Maitey's widow or Eduard had the chance to see King Kalākaua during his visit in Berlin and Potsdam in August, 1881. However, Eduard served as an actuary in Angermünde for some time before he returned to Potsdam for the rest of his life.

== Cultural characteristics ==
Maitey likely understood his relationship to the President of the Seehandlung Christian Rother as the usual adoption in Hawai‘i (hānai). This also explains the misunderstandings in the years 1829 and 1830, when Maitey hoped in vain to return to Rother's household.

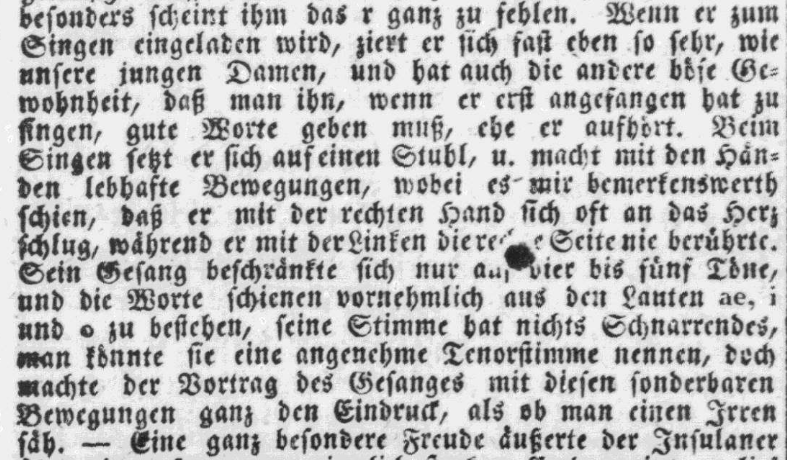
Vossische Zeitung October 18th, 1824 (Scholarly and art news)

A newspaper report from 1824 shows that Maitey performed a hula in Berlin, which can be identified as a hula noho:

When he is invited to sing, he adorns himself almost as much as our young ladies, and also has the other nasty habit that when he first started singing one has to give him good words before he stops. When singing, he sits down on a chair, and makes vigorous movements with the hands, and it seemed to me remarkable that he often struck with the right hand to the heart, while he never touched the right side with the left. His singing was limited to four or five tones, and the words seemed primarily to consist from the sounds ae, i, o, his voice is not creaky, you could call it a pleasant tenor voice, but the presentation of the song with these strange movements made quite the impression as if you saw a madman.

— Königlich priviligierte Berlinische Zeitung von Staats und gelehrten Sachen, Im Verlage Vossischer Erben. 245stes Stück. Montag, den 18ten Oktober 1824.

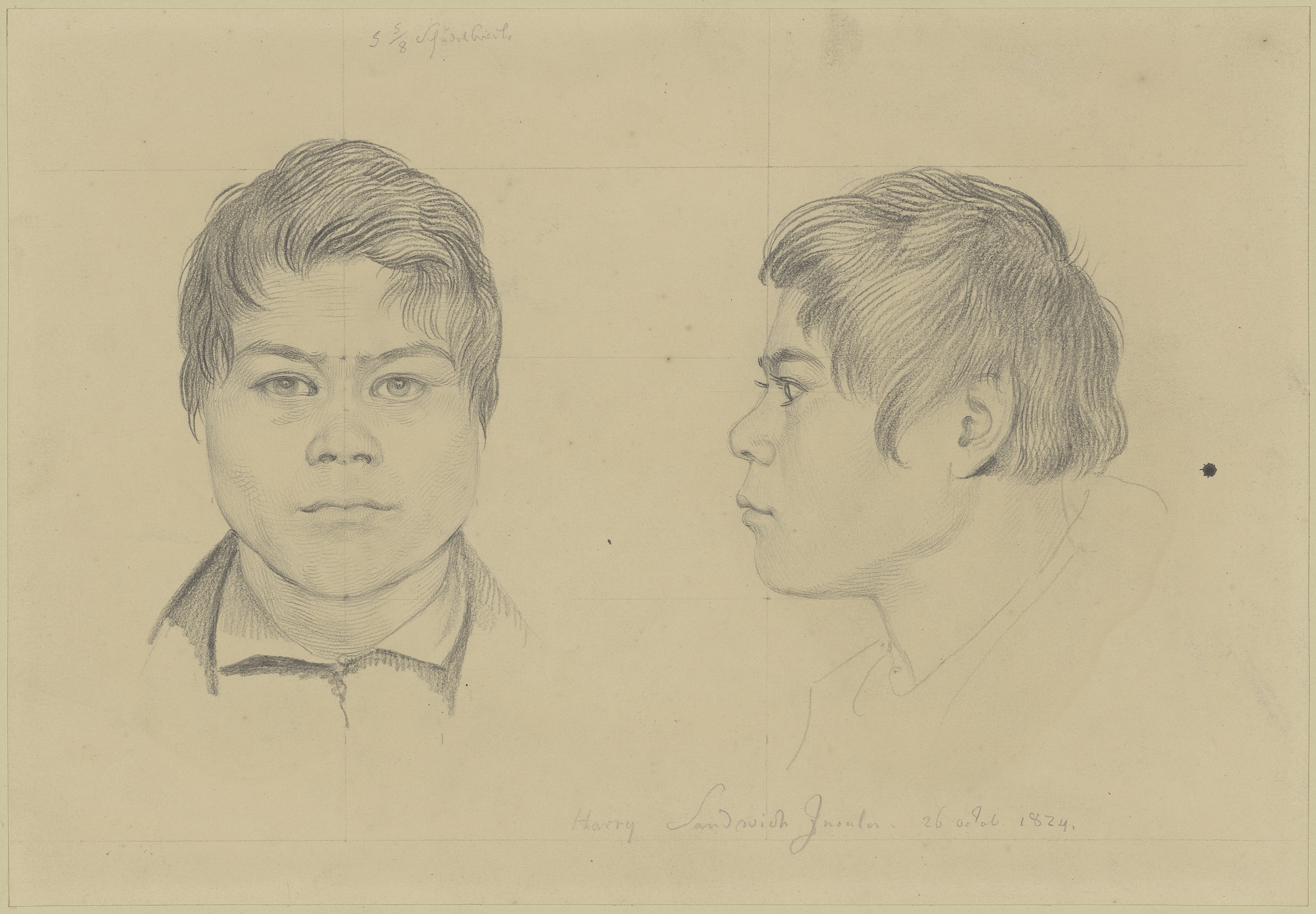
Drawing by Johann Gottfried Schadow, chalk and graphite, October 26, 1824

Johann Gottfried Schadow who was strongly interested in physiognomy drew Maitey in 1824 and noted about his appearance:

Since the same remained among us, the visual inspection shows to everyone that in its facial features no deviations can be perceived from ours. The broad cheek-bones are also found in us, and, although his skull is narrower, this is hidden by the strong and thick hair; which reasonably distinguishes him is the darker skin color. For a finer mental cultivation he found himself not suitable.

— Johann Gottfried Schadow: Polyklet oder von den Maasen des Menschen nach dem Geschlechte und Alter mit Angabe der wirklichen Naturgröße nach dem rheinländischen Zollstocke und Abhandlung von dem Unterschiede der Gesichtszüge und Kopfbildung der Völker des Erdboden, als Fortsetzung des hierüber von Peter Camper ausgegangenen von Gottfried Schadow. Berlin 1834, S. 26/27., Quoted by Wilfried M. Heidemann: Der Sandwich-Insulaner Maitey von der Pfaueninsel: Die Lebensgeschichte eines hawaiischen Einwanderers in Berlin und bei Potsdam von 1824 bis 1872. Mitteilungen des Vereins für die Geschichte Berlins 80. Jahrgang, Nr. Heft 2 (April 1984): pp. 153–172, p. 162.
