= Emil Wolff =

German sculptor

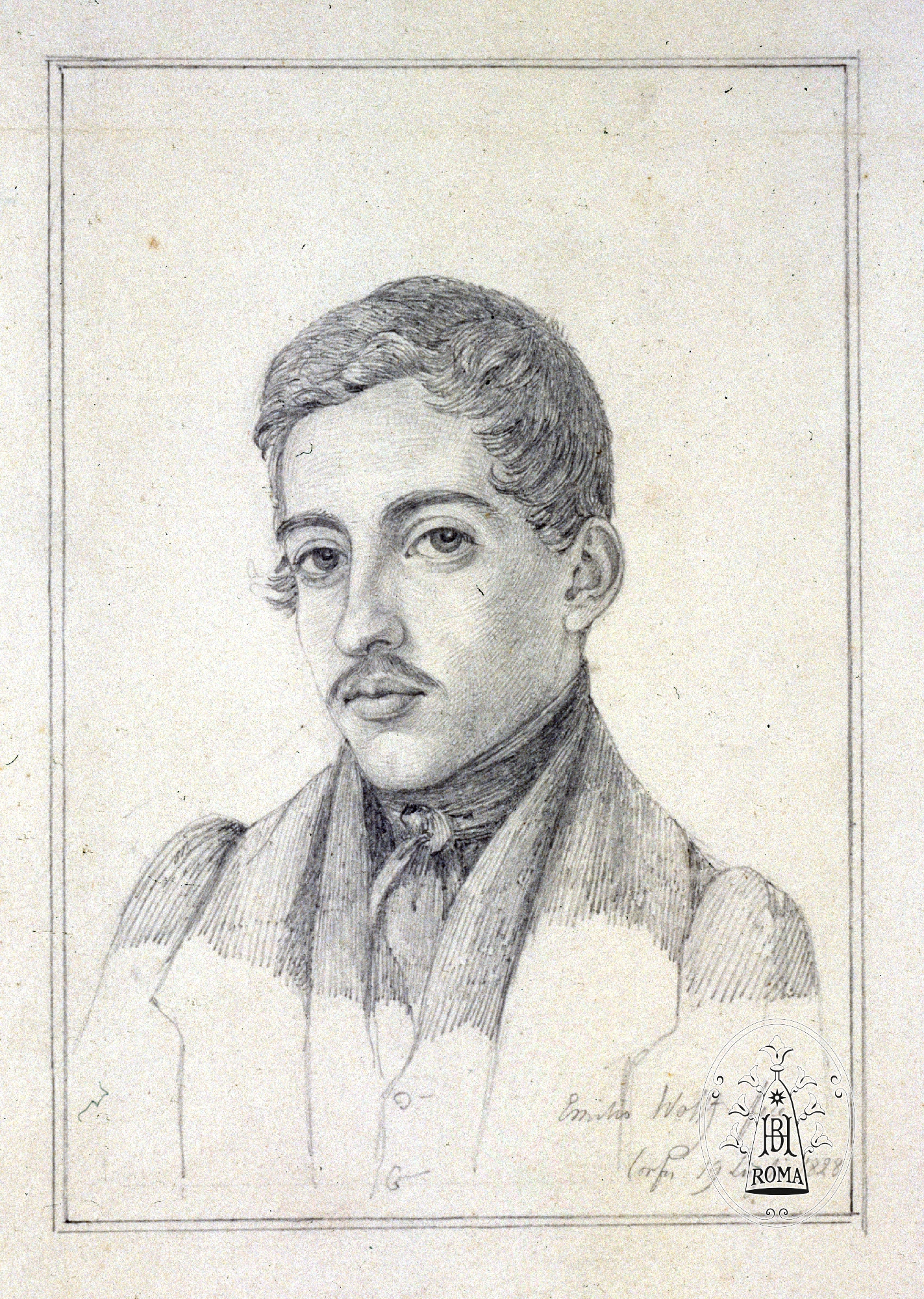
Emil Wolff, self-portrait 1828

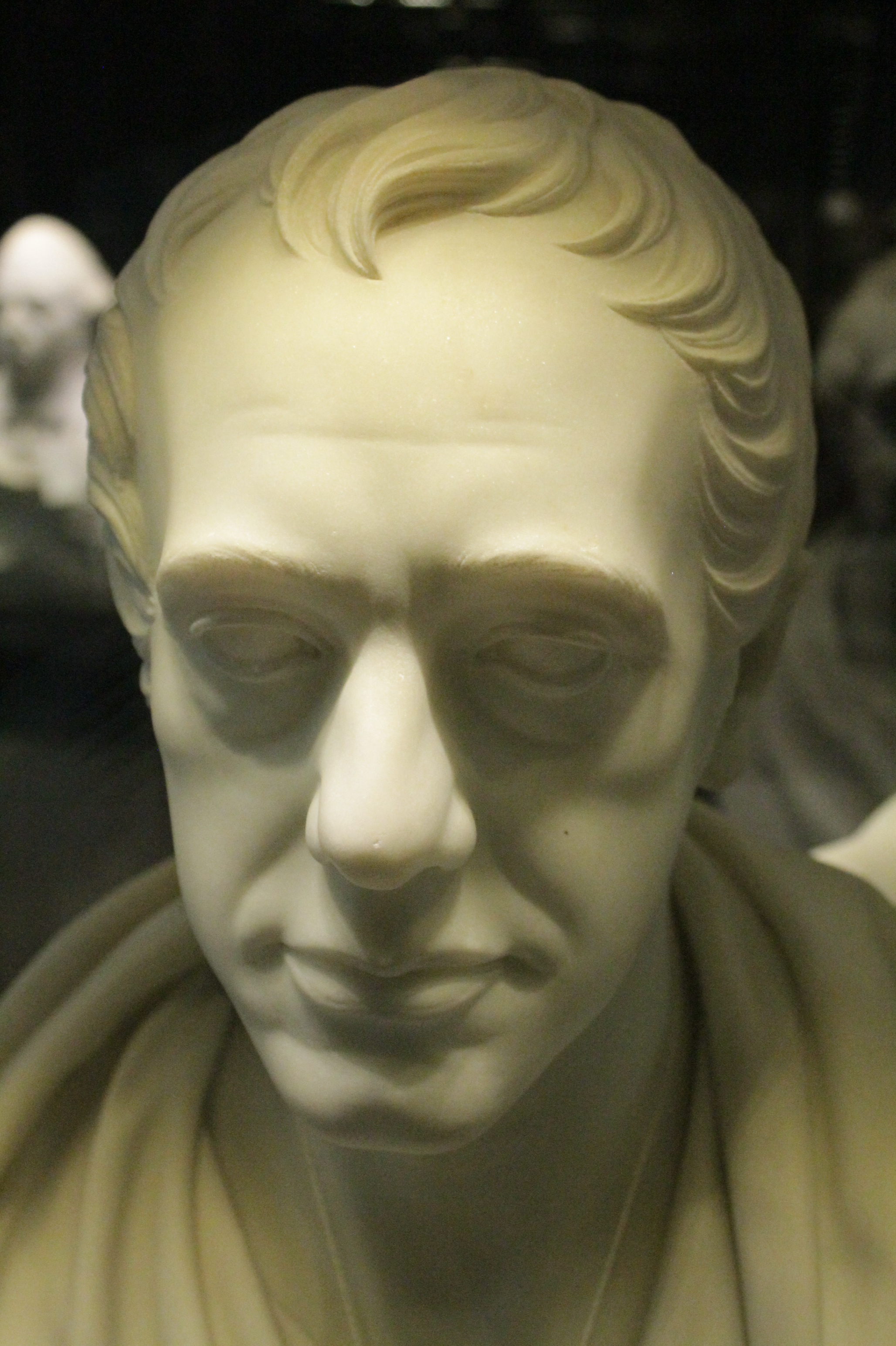
Thomas Fowell Buxten by Emil Wolff 1839, Albertinum, Dresden

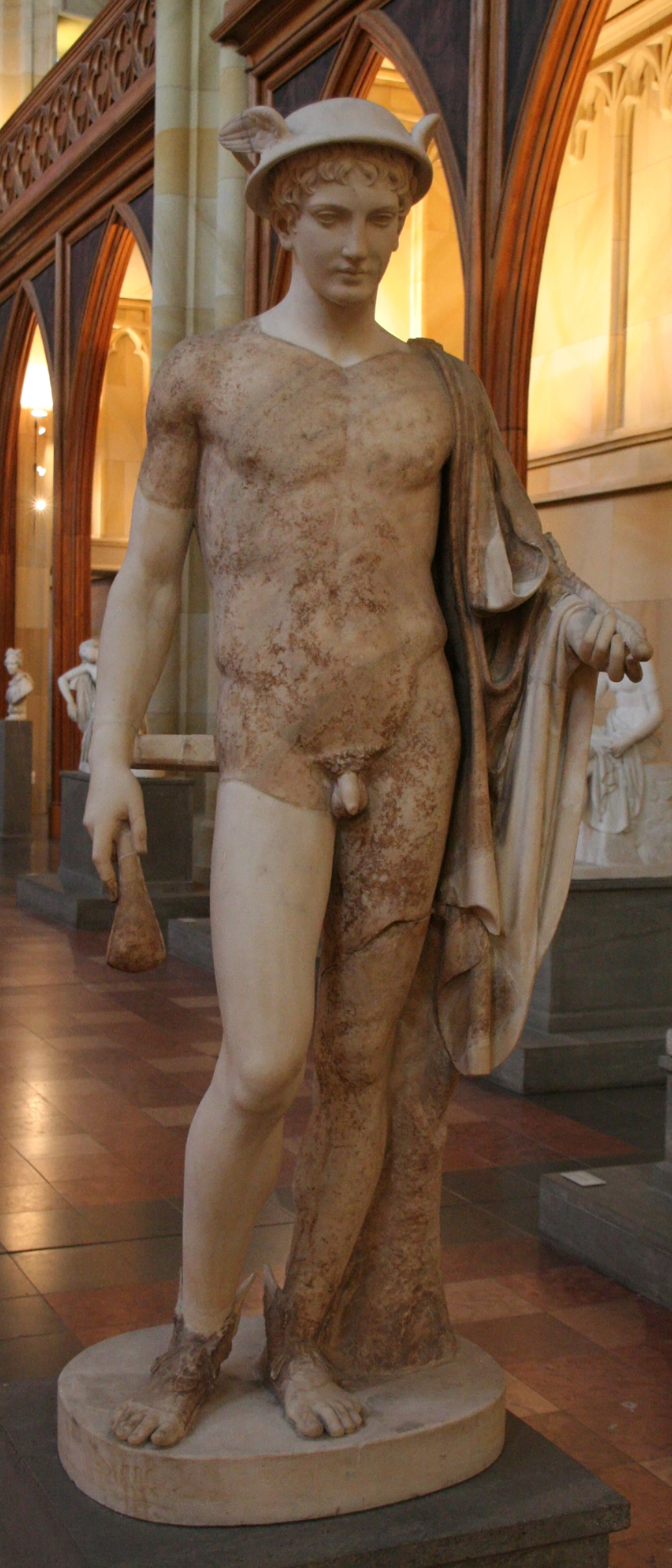
Hermes

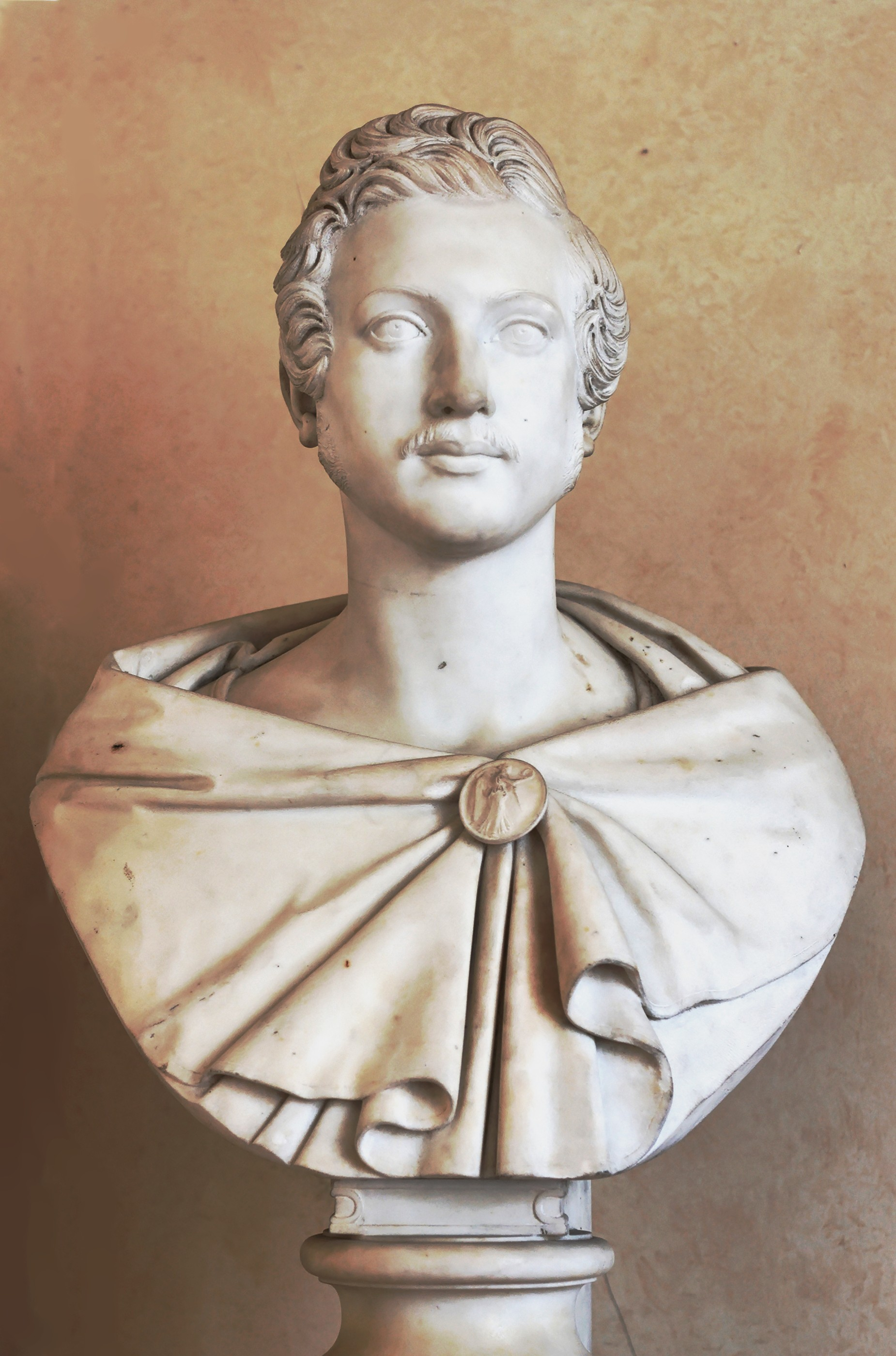
Prince Albert in the Louvre

Emil Wolff (1802–1879) was a 19th-century German sculptor and occasional artist in oil paints.

He is well-represented in galleries across Europe.

== Life ==
He was born in Berlin on 2 March 1802. From 1815 he studied at the Prussian Academy of Arts in Berlin. He won a scholarship to study in Rome in 1822 under Bertel Thorwaldsen.

In 1854 King Friedrich Wilhelm IV purchased "Najade" for erection at Sanssouci. This was removed in 1985 due to erosion but replaced with a replica in 2017.

In 1865 he exhibited at the Dublin International Exhibition.

He died in Rome on 29 September 1879.

== Family ==
His maternal uncle was the sculptor Johann Gottfried Schadow.

== Works ==
see etc

- Midas as a Judge (1825)
- Charitas (1830)
- The Night (1830)
- Telephos suckled by the Doe
- Hebe and Ganymede (1834)
- Diana after the Hunt (1838)
- Meleagro (1841)
- The Amazons
- Prometheus (1844)
- Jephtha and his Daughter (1858)
- Psyche after Amor's Escape
- Judith (1868)
- Bertel Thorwaldsen
- The Tambourine Beater
- Johann Winckelmann
- Barthold Georg Niebuhr
- Giovanni Pierluigi da Palestrina
- Hermes
- Youthful Satyr
- Young Bacchus
