= Johann Gottfried Schadow =

German sculptor (1764–1850)

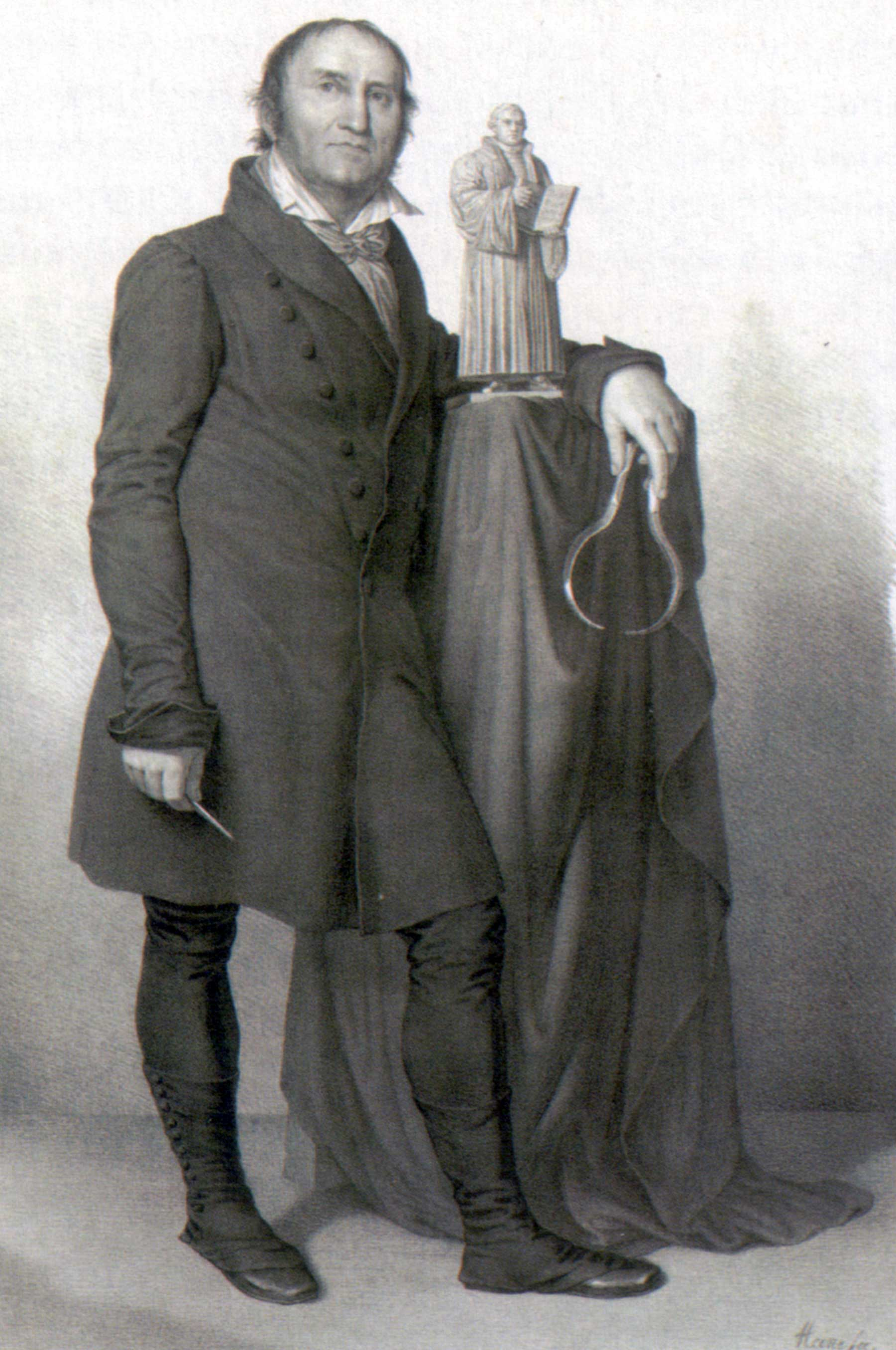
Lithographic print (1830) of Johann Gottfried Schadow

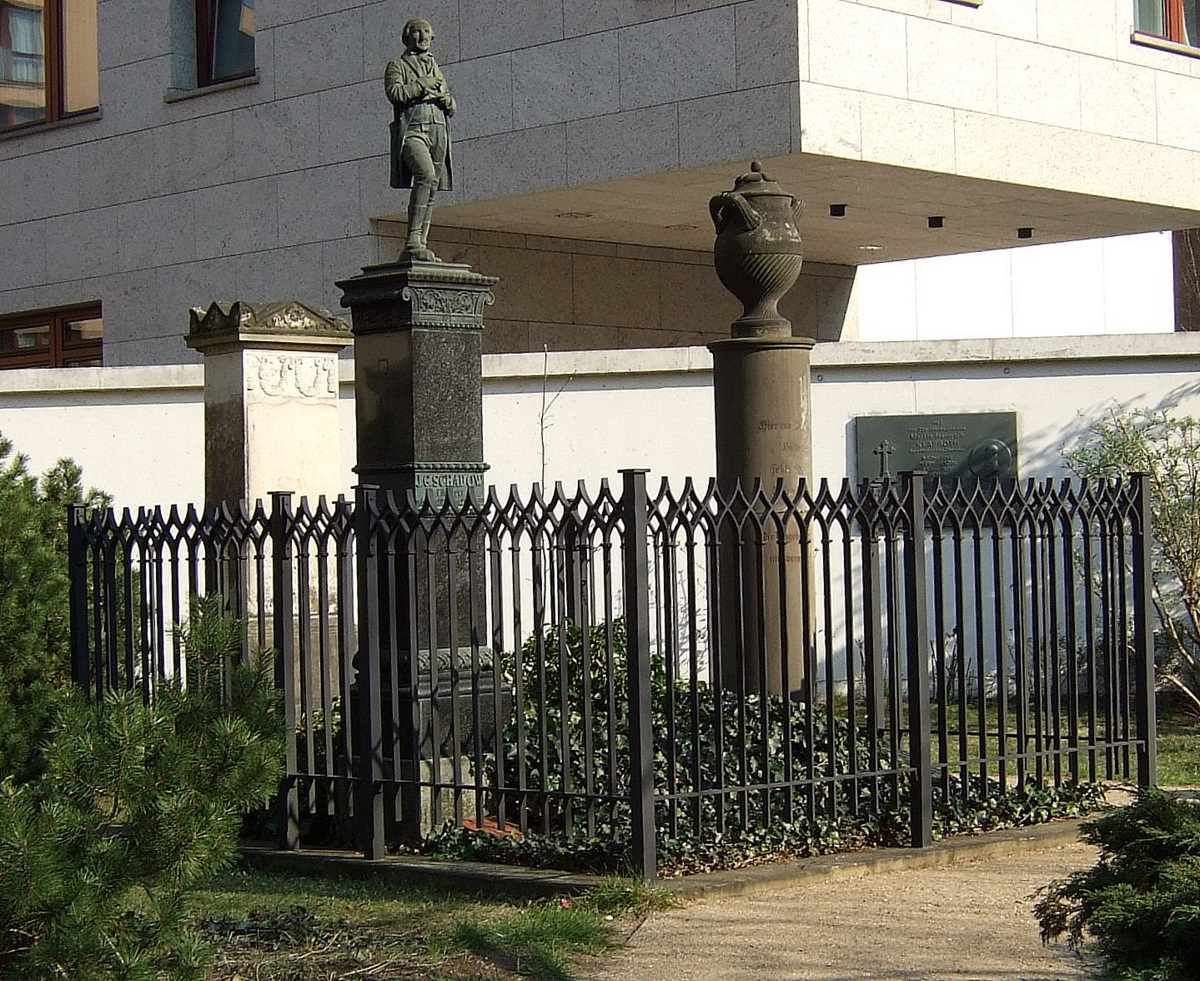
Schadow's grave in Berlin

Johann Gottfried Schadow (20 May 1764 – 27 January 1850) was a German Prussian sculptor.

His most iconic work is the chariot on top of the Brandenburg Gate in Berlin.

== Biography ==
Schadow was born in Berlin, where his father was a poor tailor.

He trained as a sculptor under Antoine Tassaert, who was patronized by Frederick the Great. Taessert offered his daughter in marriage, but the pupil preferred to elope with a Jewish girl, Marianne Devidel in Rome and Taessert not only condoned the offense but furnished money for their stay in Italy. After he married Devidel in Rome he also won the sculptors prize from the Accademia di San Luca in 1786. Having been influenced by the sculptor Antonio Canova during his stay in Rome he returned to Berlin in 1788 to succeed Tassaert as sculptor to the court and secretary to the Prussian Academy of Arts and Royal Porcelain Factory. Upon his return, his first work was the tomb of the son of the Prussian King Friedrich Wilhelm II, Alexander von der Mark. Over half a century he produced upwards of two hundred works, varied in style as in subjects.

Among his ambitious efforts are Frederick the Great in Stettin, Blücher in Rostock and Luther in Wittenberg. His portrait statues of Frederick the Great with the dogs and the Princess Monument Louise and her sister Frederica with the princesses Louise and Federica became very popular. The second one was copied many times illegally which lead to a temporary dispute between his gypsum modeler Beyer and the sculptor in September 1795. His busts, of which there are more than one hundred, include seventeen colossal heads in the Walhalla, Ratisbon; Goethe, Wieland, and Fichte were modelled from life.

Of church monuments and memorial works thirty are enumerated; yet Schadow hardly ranks among Christian sculptors. He is claimed by classicists and idealists: the quadriga on the Brandenburger Tor and the allegorical frieze on the facade of the Royal Mint, both in Berlin, are judged among the happiest studies from the antique. Schadow, as director of the Berlin Academy, had great influence. He wrote on the proportions of the human figure, on national physiognomy, etc.; and many volumes by himself and others describe and illustrate his method and his work.

His interest in physiognomy is documented by the drawing he made of Harry Maitey, the first Hawaiian in Prussia.

Today, some of his sculptures and busts are displayed in the Friedrichswerdersche Kirche and the Alte Nationalgalerie in Berlin.

Schadow developed a friendship with Johann Wolfgang von Goethe when at first Goethe's son visited Schadow in Weimar. Schadow created 12 bronze medals of Goethe. One such medal is in the property of the British Museum.

He died in Berlin in 1850. His sons Rudolph and Friedrich Wilhelm were notable for sculpture and painting, respectively. He was the grandfather of admiral Felix von Bendemann of the German Imperial Navy.

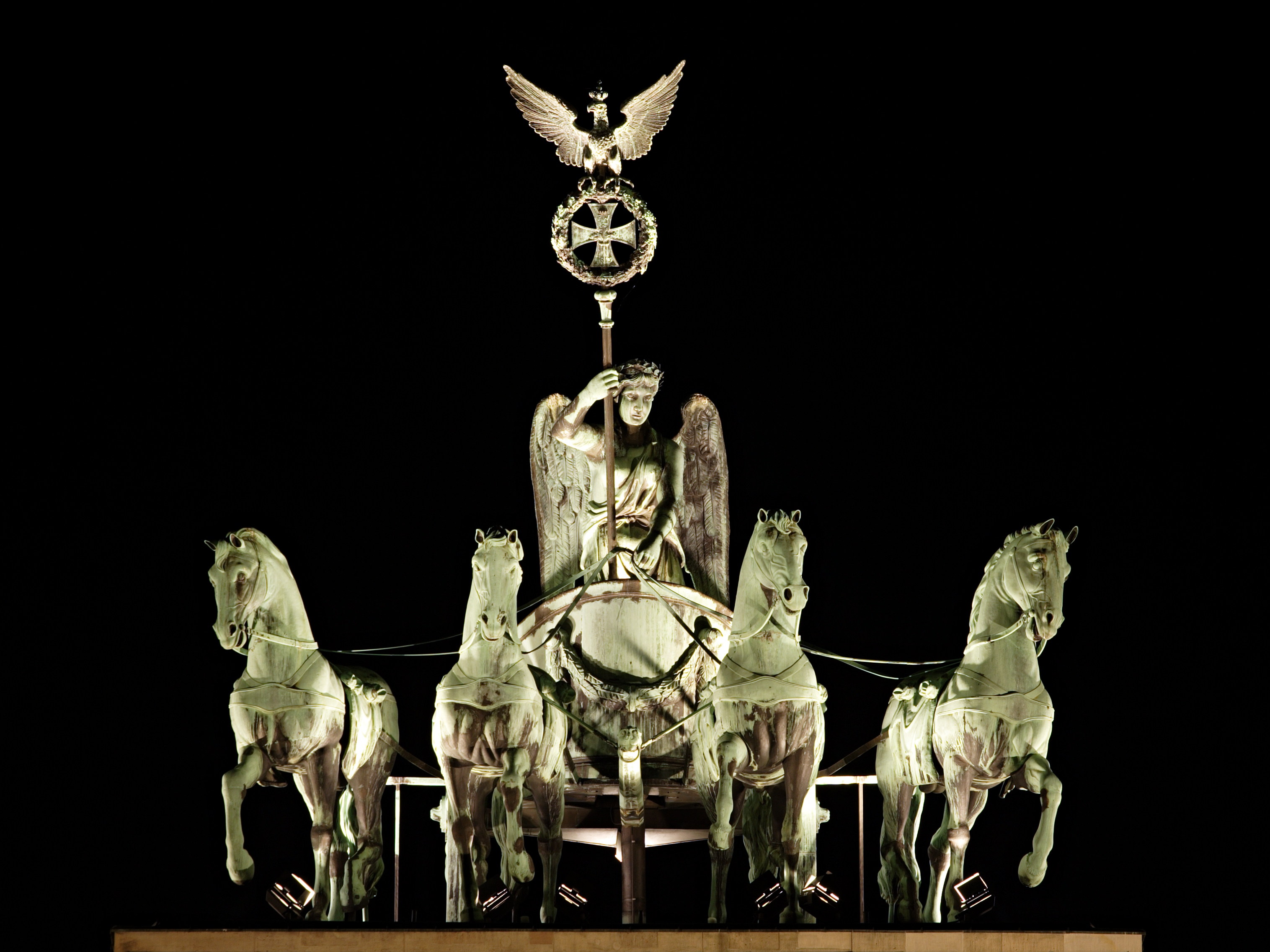
The centrepiece of the Brandenburg Gate in Berlin

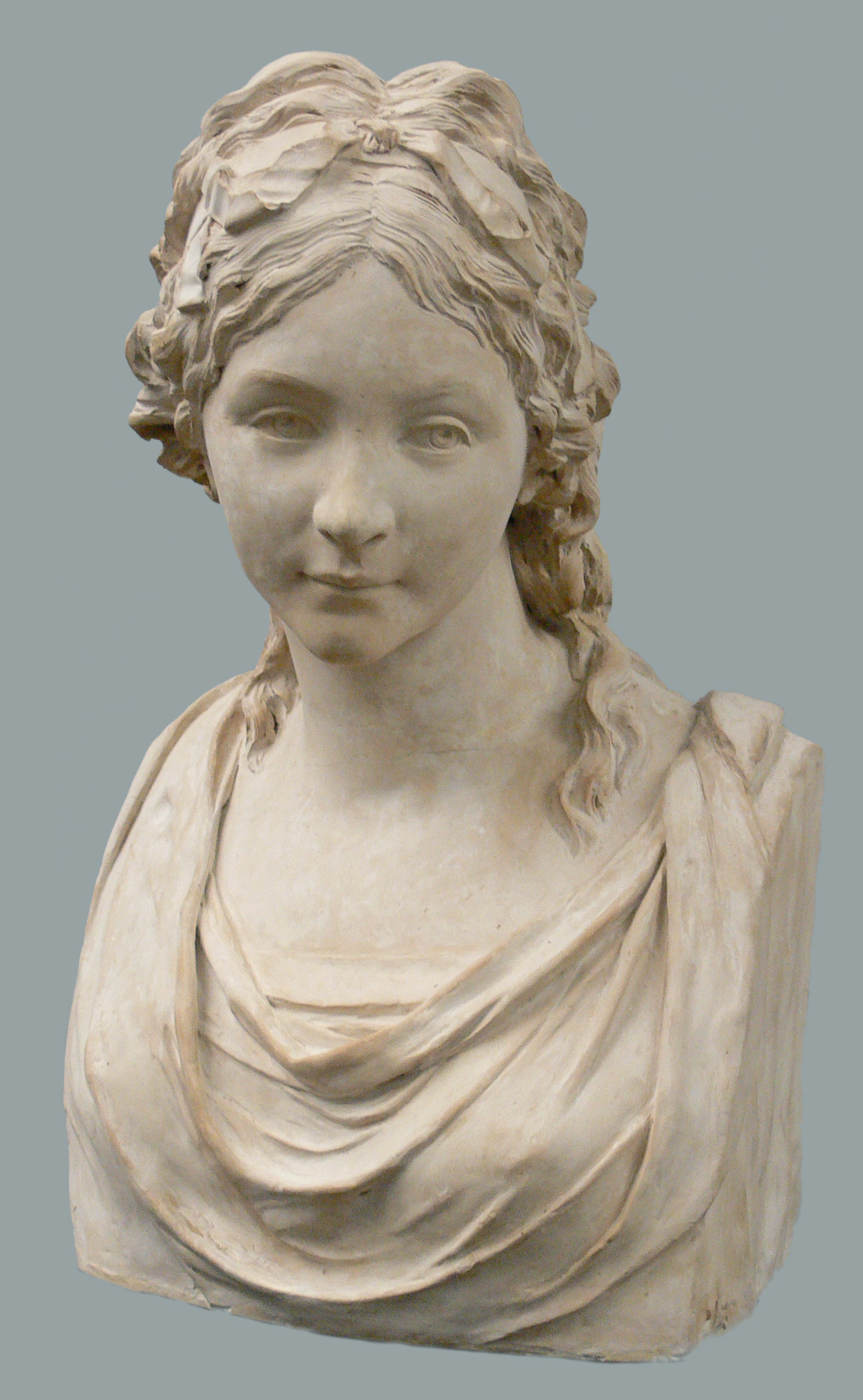
Frederica of Prussia

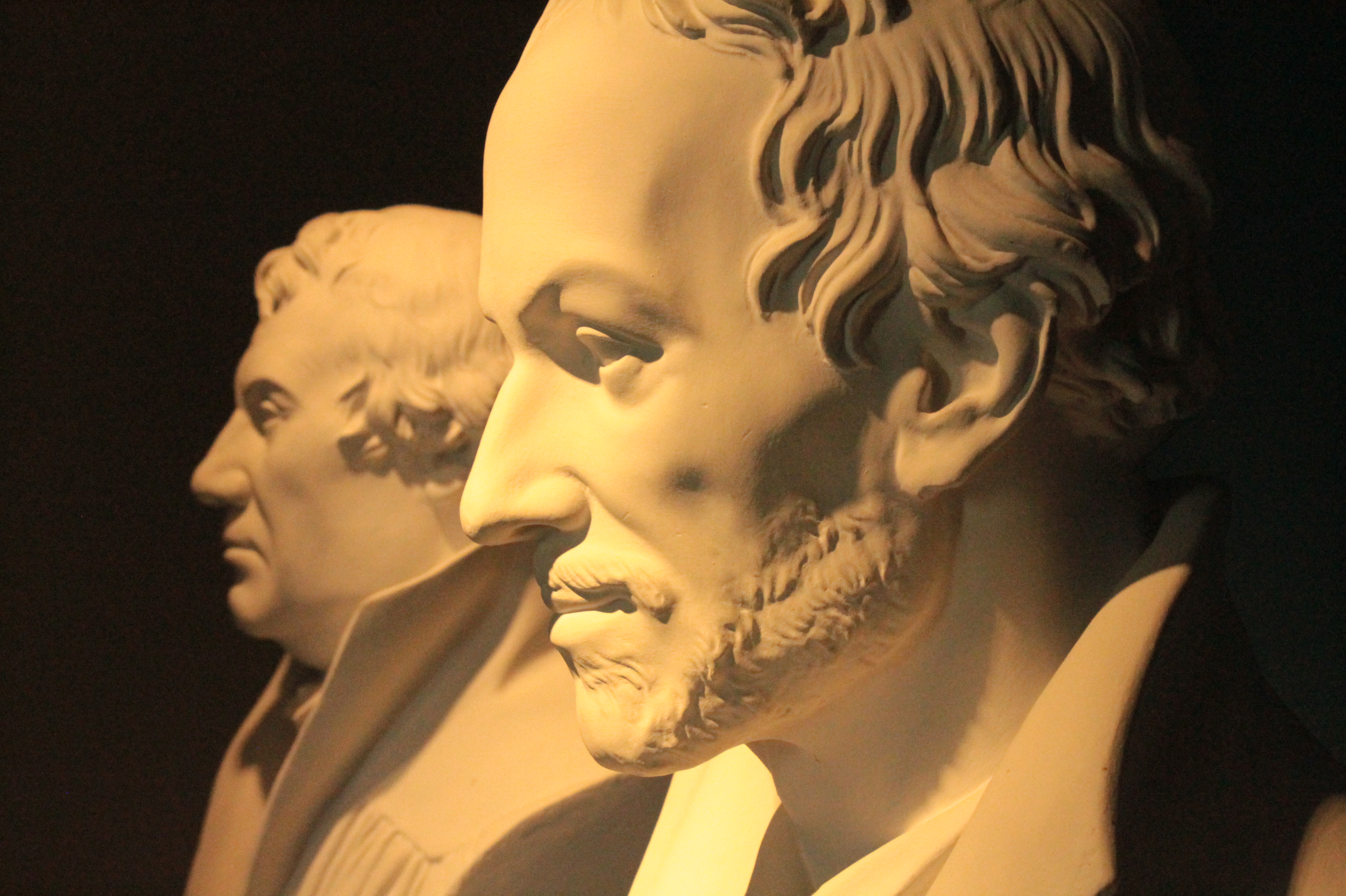
Melanchthon with Luther behind, by Schadow, Melanchthon House Museum, Wittenberg

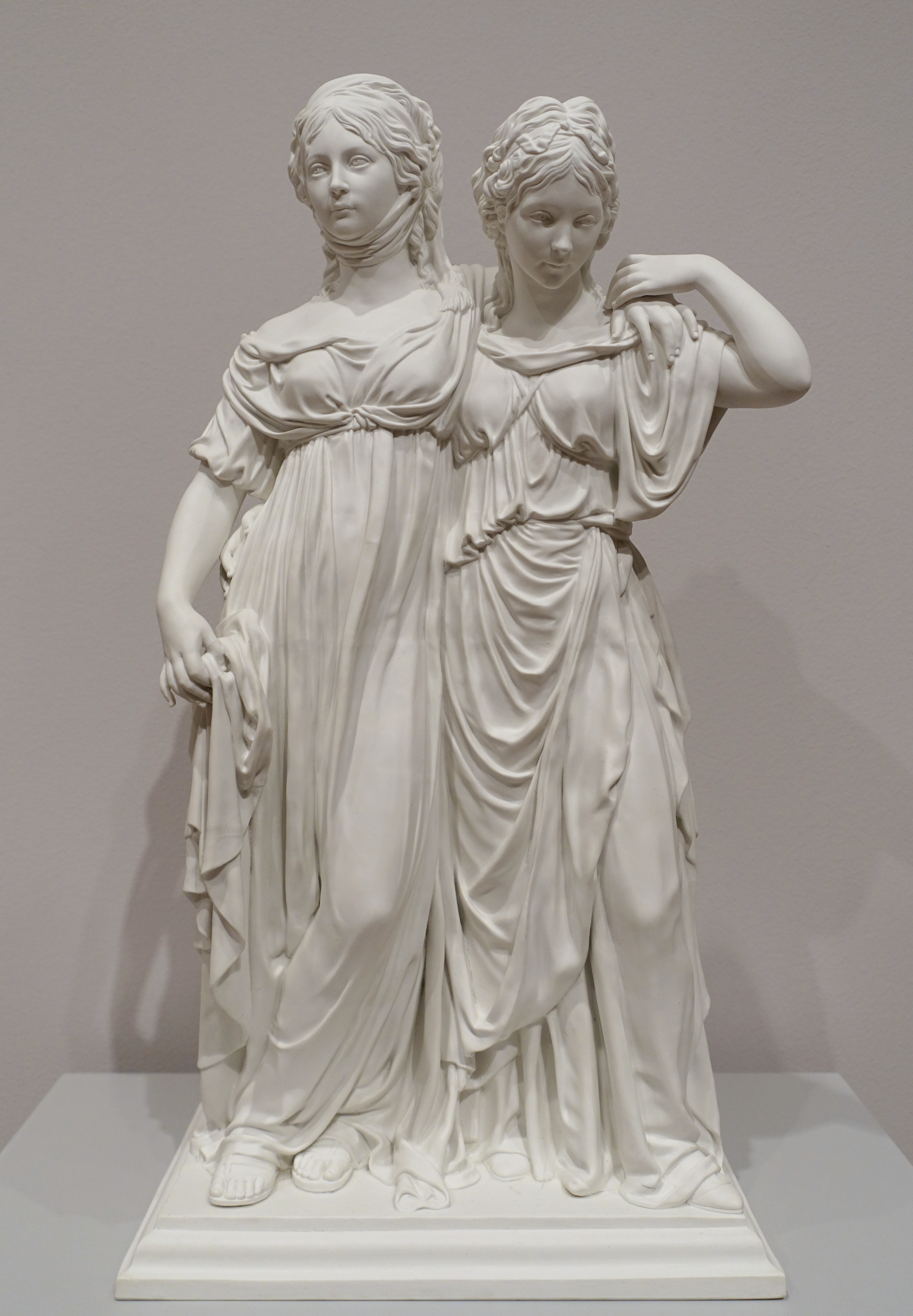
The Prinzessinengruppe: Schadow's famous statue of Friederica (right), with her sister, Louise

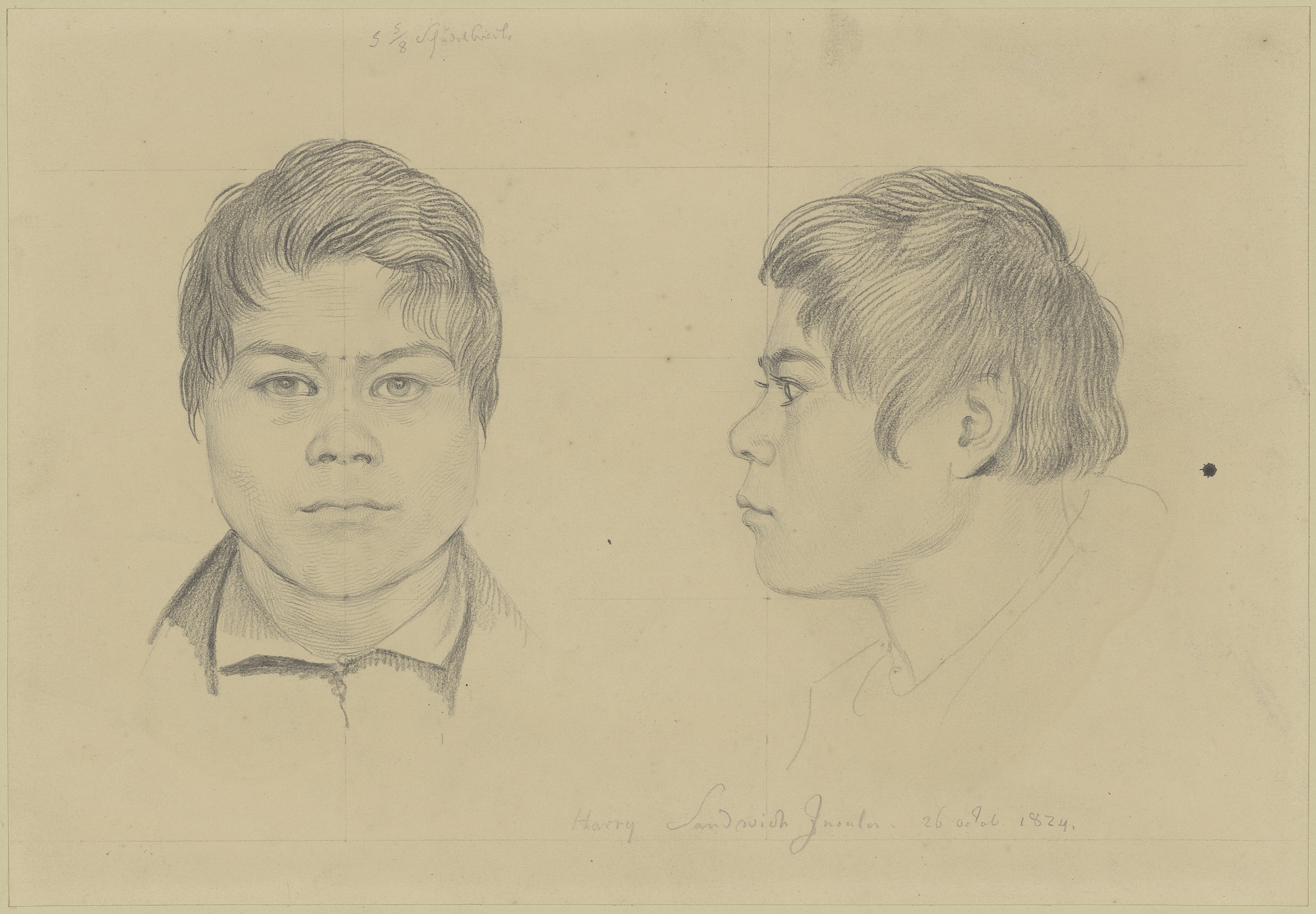
Drawing of Harry Maitey, chalk and graphite, October 26, 1824

== Family ==
He was uncle to the sculptor Emil Wolff.
