= Rudolph Schadow =

German sculptor

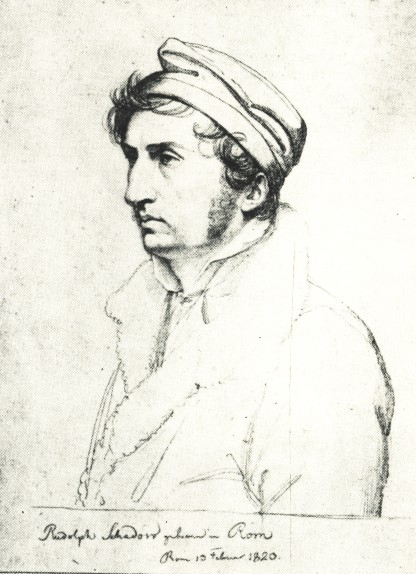
- Drawing by Carl Christian Vogel von Vogelstein, 1820

Rudolph Schadow (also spelled Ridolfo Schadow; July 9, 1786 – January 31, 1822) was a German sculptor.

== Biography ==
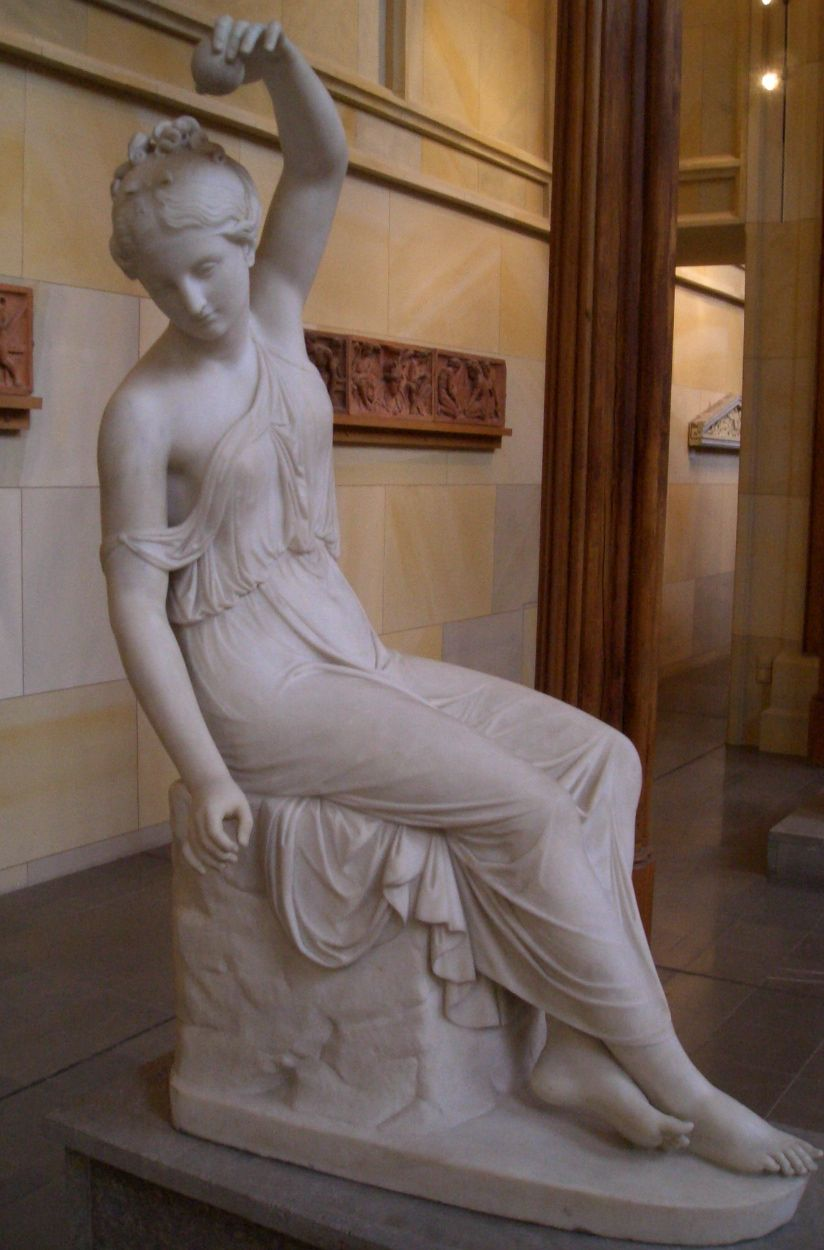
The Spinner (German: Die Spinnerin)

Born in Rome, he had his father, Johann Gottfried Schadow, at Berlin, for his first master.

In 1810 he went to Rome and received kindly help from Canova and Thorvaldsen. His talents were versatile; his first independent work was a figure of Paris, and it had for its companion a spinning girl. The latter, a portrayal of a young girl spinning, proved to be extremely popular among visitors to Rome, and even admirers of the work of Canova and Thorvaldensen acknowledged its worth. Schadow made several other versions of the work, the first probably between 1814 and 1816. The King of Prussia, Prince Esterhazy and the Duke of Devonshire all expressed a wish to include this statue in their collections. One version completed in 1820 is on display in the Hermitage, which acquired it from the Znamenka Palace, near St. Petersburg, in 1930.

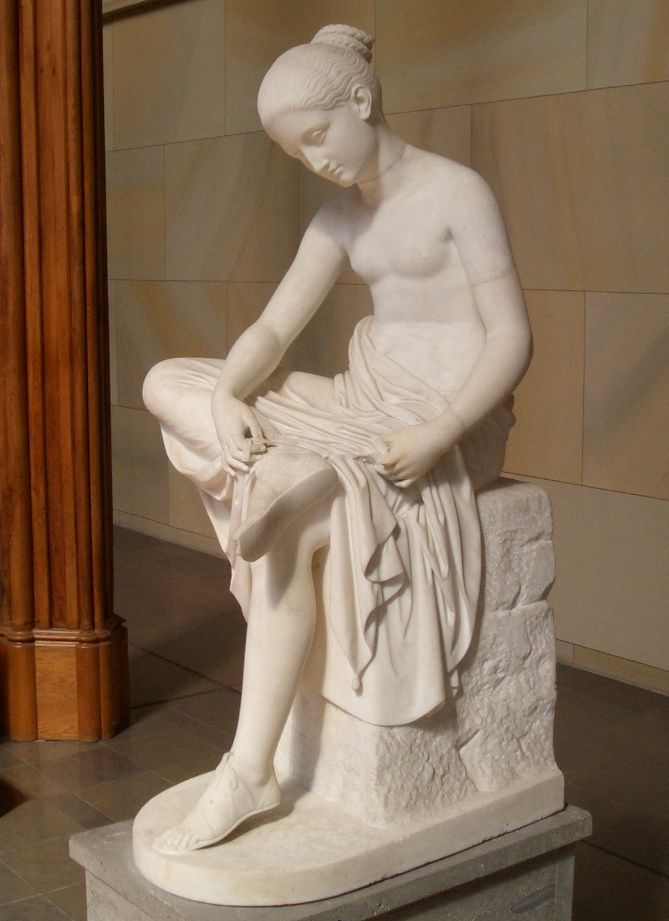
Putting on a sandal (German: Die Sandalenbinderin)

Embracing the Roman Catholic faith, he produced statues of John the Baptist and of the Virgin and Child. In England he became known by bas-reliefs executed for the Duke of Devonshire and for the Marquess of Lansdowne.

His last composition, commissioned by the king of Prussia, was a colossal group, Achilles with the Body of Penthesilea; the model, universally admired for its antique character and the largeness of its style, had not been carried out in marble when in 1822 the artist died in Rome.
