= Battle of Limonest =

1814 battle during the War of the Sixth Coalition

- Part of the Campaign of France of the Sixth Coalition
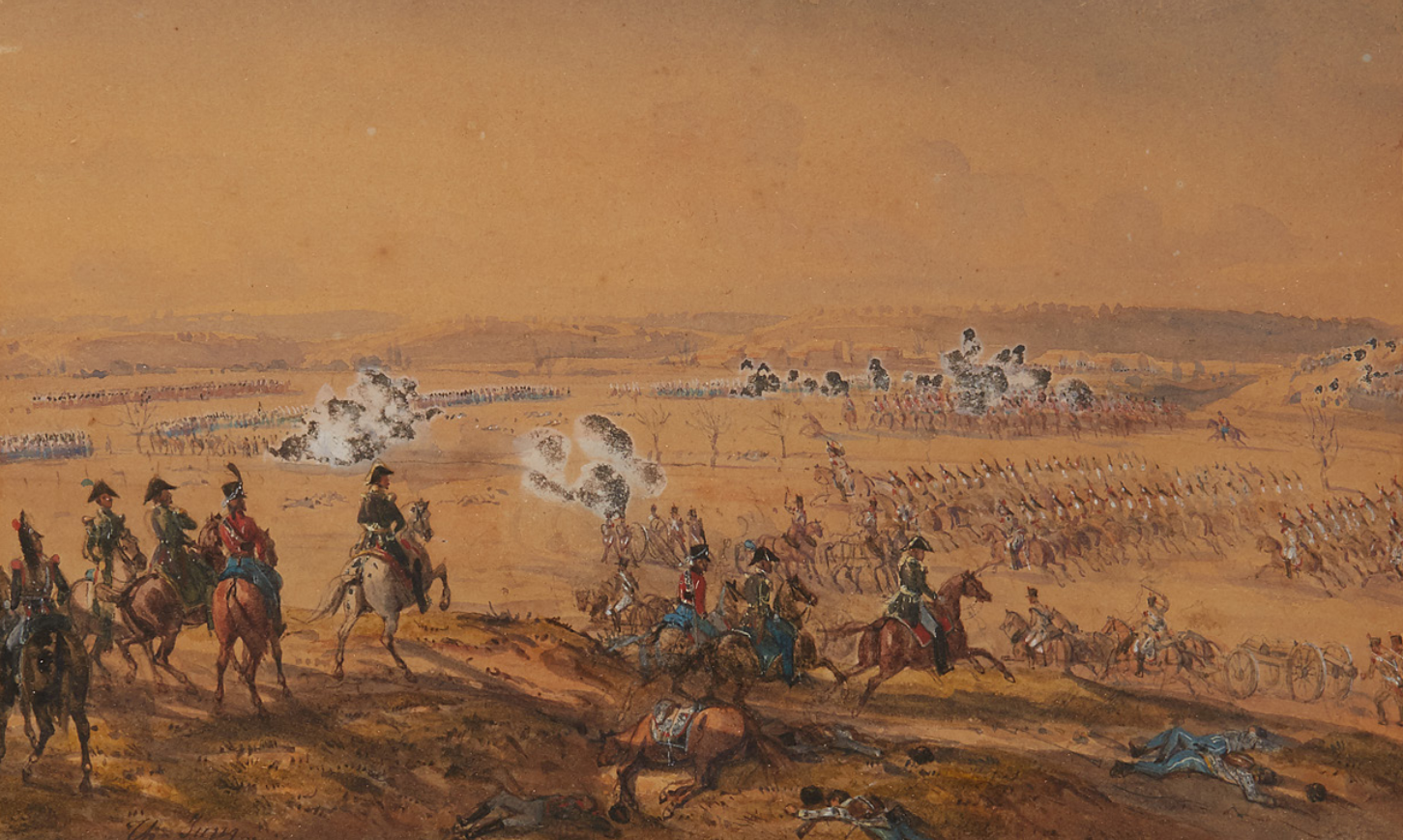
- Charge of the 13th Cuirassiers Regiment at the Battle of Limonest, 20 March 1814, by Theodore Jung
| Date | 20 March 1814 |
| Location | Limonest, France 45°50′13″N 4°46′19″E |
| Result | Coalition victory |

Belligerents
| Austrian Empire; Grand Duchy of Hesse | First French Empire |

Commanders and leaders
| (Austrian Empire) Prince Frederick of Hessen-Homburg | (France) Pierre Augereau |

Units involved
| (Austrian Empire) 1st Corps (Austrian Empire) 2nd Corps; 6th German Corps | (France) Army of the Rhône |

Strength
| 56,000, 124 guns 30,000 | 24,269, 33 guns 20,000, 36 guns |

Casualties and losses
| 2,875, 1,700, 2,900 | 1,000, 2,000, 2,000 |
- Location within France

War of the Sixth Coalition:
Campaign in north-east France
current battle
Napoleon in command
Napoleon not in command

The Battle of Limonest (20 March 1814) saw an army of Austrian and Hessian troops led by General der Kavallerie Prince Frederick of Hessen-Homburg attack a smaller French army under Marshal Charles-Pierre Augereau. The Coalition forces defeated the French and forced them to evacuate the city of Lyon. The battle was part of the Campaign in north-east France during the War of the Sixth Coalition.

In early 1814, the Coalition armies invaded Imperial France in greatly superior numbers. While the main Allied armies faced French Emperor Napoleon to the east of Paris, a secondary campaign was conducted near Lyon and Geneva. The small French army based on Lyon could not be ignored because it threatened the Coalition supply lines running back to Germany. Ultimately, the Allies captured Lyon, but they were compelled to divert considerable forces from the more important effort against Napoleon. (Note: The terms "Coalition" and "Allies" are used interchangeably.)

== Background ==
=== Strategic situation ===
After decisively losing the Battle of Leipzig, Napoleon escaped to France with only 60,000–70,000 soldiers. In addition, there were almost 100,000 French troops trapped in German garrisons and completely lost to Napoleon. Napoleon deployed a cordon defense along the Rhine River, from north to south, with General of Division (GD) Nicolas Joseph Maison's 15,000 men in the Netherlands, Marshal Étienne Macdonald's 11,500 men on the lower Rhine, GD Horace Sébastiani's 4,500 men near Koblenz, Marshal Auguste de Marmont's 13,000 men on the middle Rhine, and Marshal Claude Victor's 10,000 men on the upper Rhine. On the far right at Lyon, there were 1,600 men, the beginning of a small army under Marshal Augereau. Ultimately, Augereau's command would be reinforced by 8,051 infantry, 2,132 cavalry, and 18 guns drawn from Marshal Louis-Gabriel Suchet's army in the eastern Pyrenees.

Opposing these feeble French forces, the Allies would employ 230,000 Austrians, 278,000 Russians, 278,000 Prussians, 197,000 German allies, and 20,000 Swedes. Many of these soldiers were tied up blockading French-held fortresses. The Allied strategy called for the corps of Lieutenant Generals Friedrich Wilhelm Freiherr von Bülow and Ferdinand von Wintzingerode to invade the Netherlands, the Army of Silesia under Field Marshal (FM) Gebhard Leberecht von Blücher to cross the middle Rhine, and the Army of Bohemia under FM Karl Philipp, Prince of Schwarzenberg to cross the upper Rhine. The Army of Bohemia detached 12,000 men under Feldmarschall-Leutnant (FML) Ferdinand, Graf Bubna von Littitz to occupy Switzerland. It was determined to mask rather than besiege the French frontier fortresses.

=== Early operations ===
The Army of Bohemia crossed the Rhine on 20 December 1813, followed by the Army of Silesia on 1 January 1814 and Wintzingerode on 6 January. The hopelessly outnumbered French defenders retreated on all fronts without seriously resisting. When Bubna's 1st Light Division appeared before Geneva on 30 December 1813, its French commander General of Brigade (GB) Nicolas Louis Jordy suffered a disabling stroke, which led to the city's immediate surrender. This event persuaded the Austrian general that the campaign would be an easy one. Bubna's command was reorganized so that in early January 1814, it consisted of 9,000 infantry, 2,160 cavalry, and 40 guns. These were formed into four brigades under Generalmajor (GM) Joseph Klopstein, GM Johann Baptist von Longueville, GM Georg Heinrich von Scheither, and GM Theophil Zechmeister. Bubna resolved to quickly capture Lyon. Bubna advanced west with the better part of his troops and occupied Bourg-en-Bresse and Mâcon. He authorized Zechmeister's brigade to leave a small garrison in Geneva and move south toward Chambéry.

Anxious to defend his supply line back to Germany, Schwarzenberg ordered Prince Frederick of Hessen-Homburg to take command of the area between the Saône and Doubs Rivers. Accordingly, FML Prince Alois of Liechtenstein's Austrian division blockaded the French fortress of Besançon and FML Maximilian von Wimpffen's division blockaded Auxonne, while Prince Frederick set up his headquarters in Dijon. Augereau arrived to take command of Lyon on 14 January. He immediately placed GD Louis François Félix Musnier in charge of the scanty force at Lyon and went off to Valence to expedite the city's reinforcement.

Lyon sits at the confluence of the Rhône and Saône Rivers. On 16 January, Bubna's advance guard first clashed with Musnier's pickets northeast of Lyon. On 18 January, an Austrian negotiator sent to demand the city's surrender was confronted by an angry mob that screamed threats. Musnier used the situation to bluff the Austrian emissary into believing his defenders were more numerous than they really were. After a skirmish that evening, Bubna lost heart and ordered a withdrawal to Meximieux on 20 January. This unexpected withdrawal raised the morale of the citizens of Lyon so that the city's National Guard began to form. Reinforcements began trickling in to augment Musnier's garrison. Meanwhile, Zechmeister's brigade, 1,800 strong, pressed south from Geneva and occupied Chambéry. Displeased with the general in charge of Savoie, Napoleon appointed GD Jean Gabriel Marchand to assume command with GD Joseph Marie Dessaix as his deputy.

=== Later operations ===
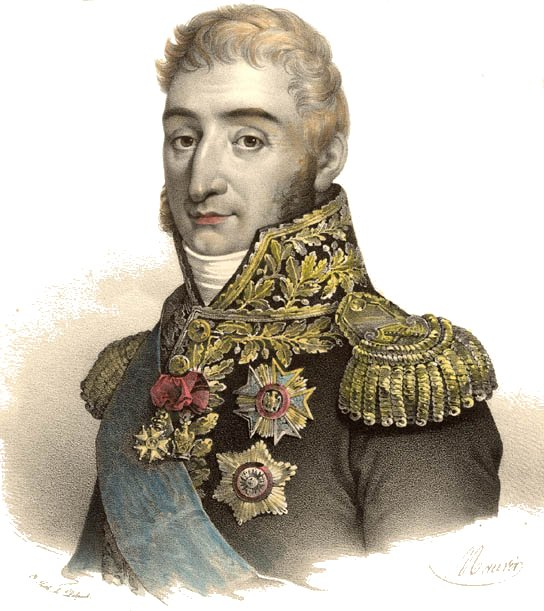
Pierre Augereau

After being steadily reinforced, Augereau's forces grew to a total of 17,000, outnumbering Bubna's 12,000. Augereau formed his small Army of the Rhône into one cavalry and four infantry divisions. Musnier led the 1st Division, GB Claude Pannetier commanded the 2nd Division, GB Martial Bardet directed the 3rd Division, and Marchand controlled the 4th Division. GD Alexandre, vicomte Digeon led the 2,000-man Cavalry Division, composed of one Cuirassier and two Hussar regiments. Augereau's counteroffensive began on 17 February with Pannetier moving north to seize Maçon, Musnier advancing northeast to capture Bourg-en-Bresse, and Marchand striking north to retake Chambéry. The French claimed to have captured 800 Austrians in the course of the operation. On 1 March, Marchand was repulsed by Bubna while trying to hustle the Austrians out of Geneva in the Battle of Saint-Julien. Bubna pulled his troops back within the defenses of Geneva.

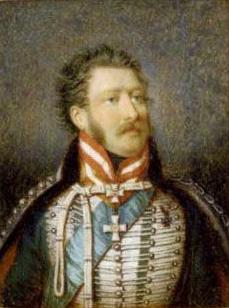
Prince Frederick of Hessen-Homburg

On 20 February 1814, a disturbing report reached Schwarzenberg's headquarters from Prince Frederick of Hessen-Homburg that Augereau's army was on the offensive. A decision was made to detach the Austrian 1st Corps under FML Frederick Bianchi from the Army of Bohemia. When Bianchi's troops marched to Dijon, the strength of the armies facing Napoleon was significantly reduced. On 1 March, Bianchi's Army of the South was made up of the infantry divisions of Bianchi and FML Prince Friedrich Wied-Runkel, the light (cavalry-infantry) division of FML Ignaz Count Hardegg, and a composite division under FML Ignaz Freiherr von Lederer consisting of Scheither's light brigade, GM Ferdinand Kuttalek's cuirassier brigade, and GM Friedrich von Fürstenwerther's elite grenadier brigade.

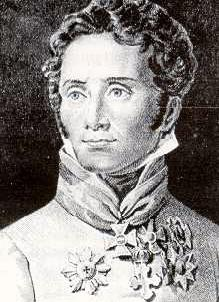
Frederick Bianchi

At first, Augereau was fixated on relieving the garrisons in Auxonne and Besançon. However, on 5 March 1814 he became aware of the massive force bearing down on Lyon via the west bank of the Saône. The Army of the Rhône rushed back to Lyon, reaching there on 9 March. Meanwhile, Augereau had seen that Lyon's defenses were improved. Fortunately for the French, the Austrian army moved slowly. Its advance guard reached Chalon-sur-Saône on 4 March. Augereau ordered Musnier to expel a force of 1,500 Austrians from Maçon on 10 March. However, his information was wrong, and Musnier's 6,000 men were badly outnumbered. After initial success, Musnier was repulsed in the Battle of Mâcon on 11 March 1814.

Augereau fell back to Saint-Georges-de-Reneins on the west bank of the Saône with 12,089 infantry, 1,725 cavalry, and 29 guns. At this stage, the Allied Army of the South counted 47,000 infantry, 5,400 cavalry, and 112 guns. Bianchi's column numbered 19,000 infantry, 3,000 cavalry, and 64 guns. Wimpffen's column numbered 11,900 infantry, 1,000 cavalry, and 24 guns. Under Hardegg on the east bank of the Saône, there were 3,700 infantry, 3,750 cavalry, and 24 guns. In addition, there were reserves under FML Prince Philip of Hesse-Homburg of which 7,000 infantry, 600 cavalry, and 8 guns were Hessians and 9,000 infantry, 750 cavalry, and 16 guns were Austrian. This massive host ponderously advanced and on 18 March, there was a clash at Saint-Georges in which the French made a spirited defense before being forced to retreat. Austrian casualties numbered 23 officers and 1,386 men. The French reported 530 casualties on 18 March. The French fell back to Limonest on the outskirts of Lyon. (Note: Note that the Allied totals (47,000 inf, 5,400 cav, 112 guns) do not square with the totals from the various columns and reserves (50,600 inf, 9,100 cav, 136 guns) even though they come from the same source. If one subtracts Hardegg's east bank force, the numbers nearly add up. (Nafziger, pp. 390–391)) At this time, Marchand's division was watching Bubna's 8,000 Austrians in Geneva.

== Battle ==
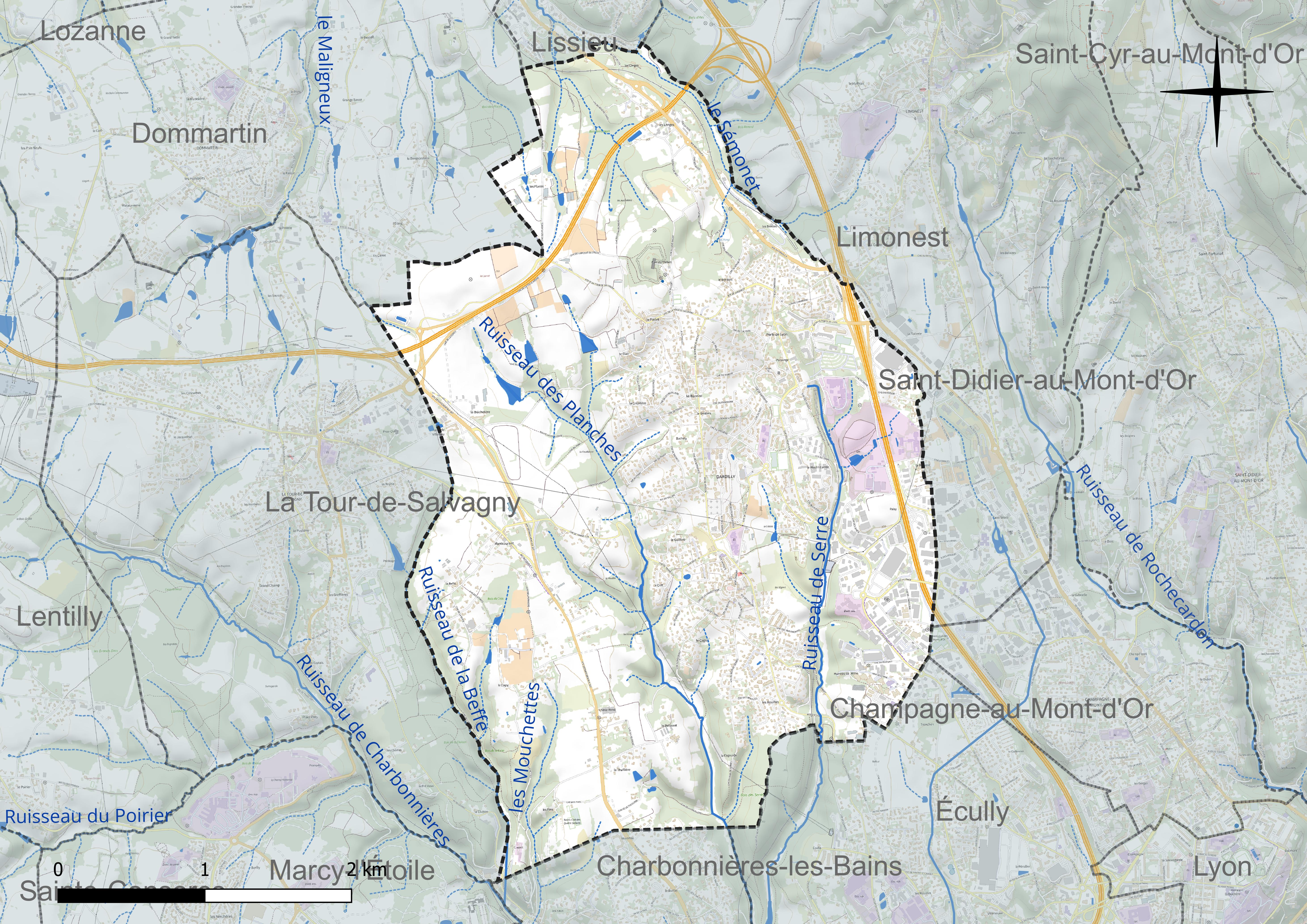
Hydrographic map of the Dardilly area shows the locations of Limonest, La Tour-de-Salvagny, and Dommartin. Mont-d'Or is at the upper right and Lyon is at the lower right.

Limonest is located 9 km (5.6 mi) northwest of Lyon. Augereau posted the 4,003 infantry of Musnier's division at Limonest. Musnier's line was supported by 6 guns and the 13th Cuirassier and 4th Hussar Regiments. To Musnier's south, the 5,781 men of Pannetier's division held Dardilly, supported by 6 guns. Pannetier's front faced toward La Tour-de-Salvagny and his right flank linked with Musnier. Farther south, the 3,621 infantry of Digeon's ad hoc division covered Grange-Blanche. Digeon was supported by 6 guns and the 12th Hussar Regiment. In reserve were 3,425 National Guards and 9 guns under GB Charles-François Rémond. The total force on the west bank of the Saône counted 15,247 infantry, 1,583 cavalry, and 27 guns.

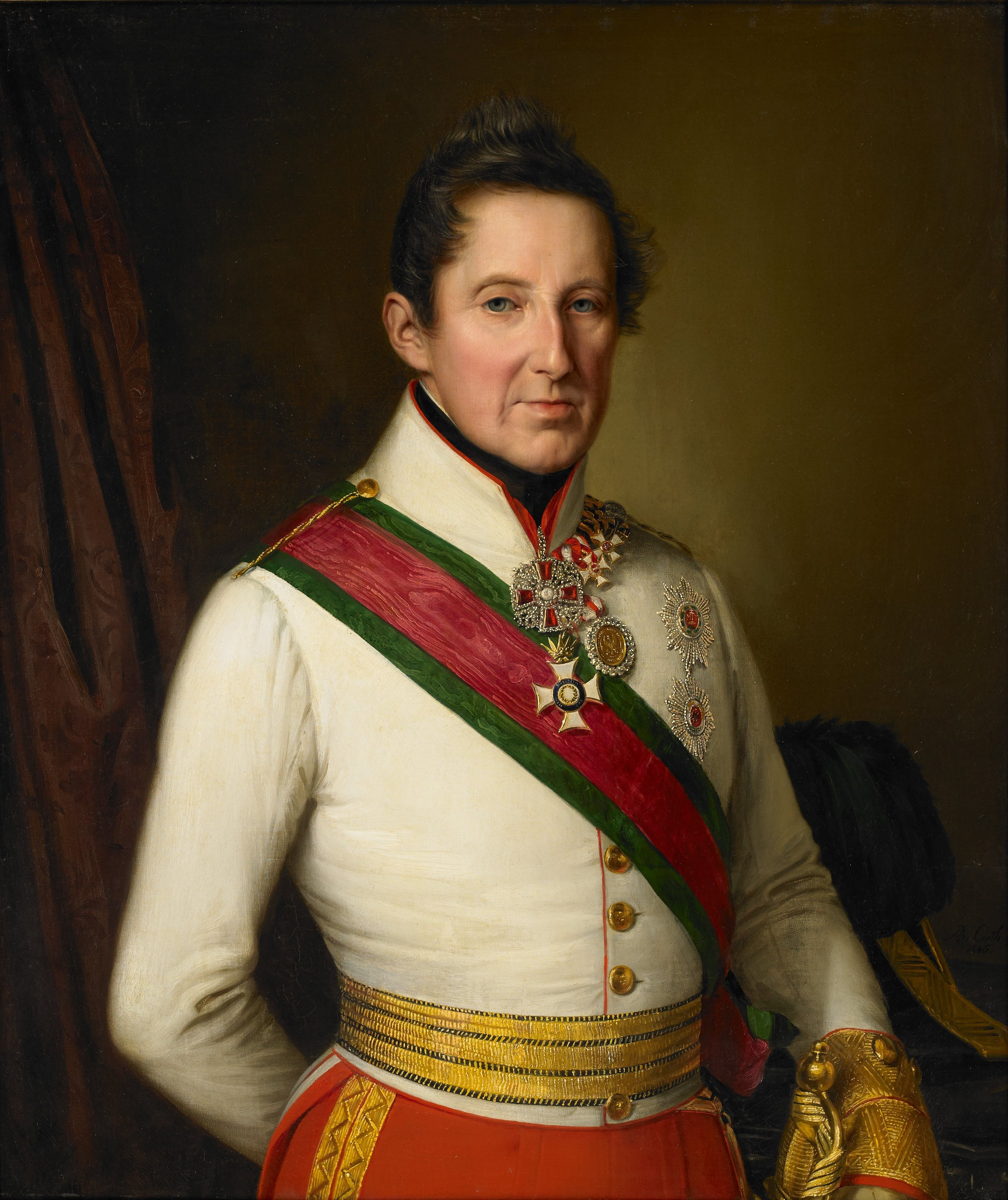
Prince Philipp of Hessen-Homburg

To the north and northeast of Limonest is a height called Mont-d'Or. The northern approaches to Lyon on the east bank of the Saône were guarded by the 5,539 infantry, 283 cavalry, and 6 guns of Bardet's division. Bardet covered an area from Miribel to the northeast of Lyon to Caluire-et-Cuire on the Saône. On both banks of the river, Augereau deployed 20,786 infantry, 1,976 cavalry, and 1,507 artillerists with 33 guns, for a total of 24,269 men. He faced an Allied army numbering 43,000 infantry, 5,000 cavalry, and 100 guns and the west bank and 8,000 infantry and 24 guns on the east bank. The Coalition total was 56,000 men and 124 guns. (Note: Nafziger wrote "8,000 infantry" on the east bank, but this may be a mistake for 8,000 troops because Hardegg had cavalry. (Nafziger, p. 394))

According to Digby Smith and Leopold Kudrna, the Allied army at Limonest was commanded by Prince Frederick of Hessen-Homburg. (Note: Nafziger's account described Prince Philipp as being in command of Bianchi and Wimpffen. Nafziger did not mention Prince Frederick at all, (Nafziger, pp. 395–397) but Smith & Kudrna asserted that he was in command at the battle.) However, George Nafziger's account suggested that Prince Philipp of Hessen-Homburg was in tactical command on the west bank, where the major fighting occurred. All the Allied columns began their approach marches at 6:00 am on 20 March 2014. Wimpffen moved his column against Limonest while sending GM Franz Mumb's brigade into the Mont-d'Or heights. Bianchi's column advanced to La Tour-de-Salvagny and formed for a frontal attack on Dardilly. Wimpffen was directed not to launch a major assault until Bianchi was in position. Meanwhile, the Allied Reserve column moved from Les Chères to Dommartin. On the east bank, Hardegg was ordered to defeat Bardet's troops.

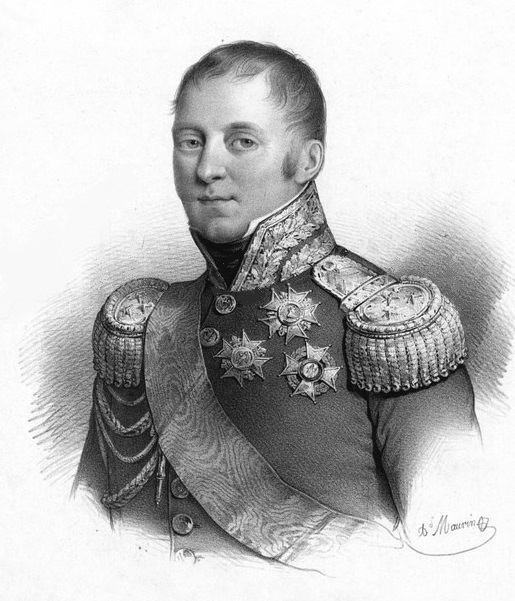
Alexandre Digeon

After some delay, Mumb's brigade with 2,600 men and 8 guns brushed aside the French picket line on Mont-d'Or. Though Mumb's brigade struggled to bring its artillery along, it seized the high ground on Mont-d'Or, including Mont Thoux, where the soldiers could look down on the French forces below them. Meanwhile, Bianchi sent FML Prince Friedrich Wied-Runckel's division to attack Pannetier's defenses. Sometime after 1:00 pm, Musnier noticed that Mumb's troops had gotten behind him and he ordered his division to retreat. The withdrawal of the rightmost division unhinged the French center. Pannetier found that his right flank was unprotected and ordered his division to abandon Dardilly and fall back toward Digeon's division. The Austrians captured Pannetier's 6 guns. Wimpffen began pressing his soldiers forward when he saw Musnier's troops fall back.

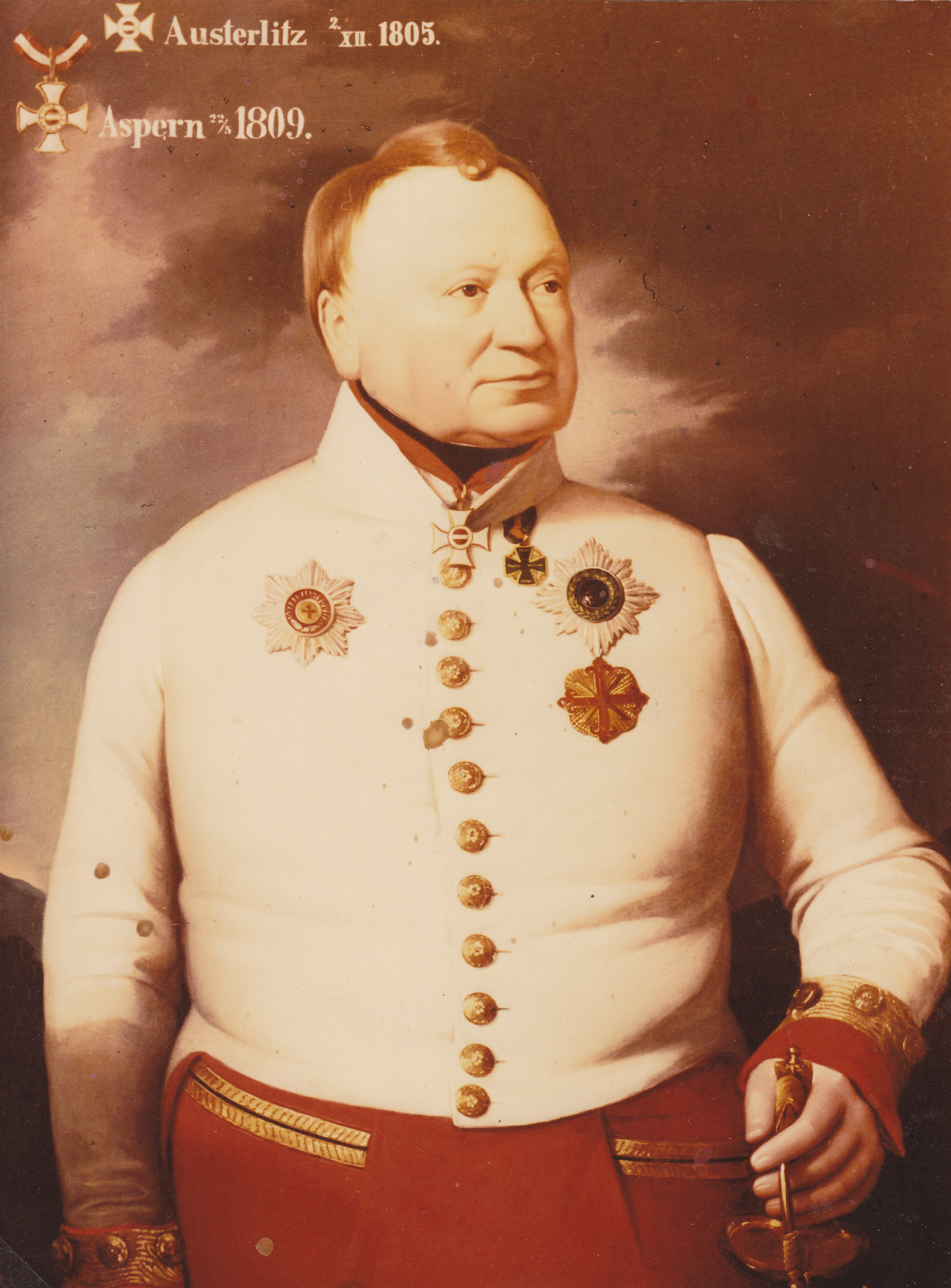
Maximilian Wimpffen

Digeon's division on the French left flank was left untouched. Digeon thrust 3 battalions, 200 cavalry, and 4 guns under GM Jean Ernest de Beurmann toward La Tour-de-Salvagny. This probe compelled Bianchi to divert Wied-Runckel's division from the main attack and allowed Musnier and Pannetier to retreat with only minor fighting. Wied-Runckel drove back Beurmann's brigade after heavy fighting near Grange-Blanche which lasted until 5:00 pm. Musnier and Pannetier withdrew to the city wall, which they reached about 3:00 pm. Augereau, who was in Lyon, only discovered the collapse of his west bank position at this hour. He ordered the French to counterattack and this prolonged the fighting until evening.

In order to allow his division to safely withdraw, Digeon ordered two cavalry charges. Two squadrons of the 13th Cuirassiers attacked an Austrian artillery battery from the flank and overran it. The Allies tried to retake the battery but the French repulsed them and carried off 6 guns. In a second charge, the 12th Hussars surprised the Austrian Hiller Infantry Regiment Nr. 2, capturing its commander and almost 400 soldiers. On the east bank, Hardegg never mounted a serious attack on Miribel. Near Caluire-et-Cuire, GM Prince Ferdinand of Saxe-Coburg and Gotha ordered the Kienmayer Hussar Regiment Nr. 8 to charge, but it was driven off by the 79th Line Infantry.

== Result ==
On the evening of 20 March, Augereau met with the city authorities and determined that holding Lyon was not feasible. He ordered the artillery and other wheeled vehicles to leave the city in silence. They were followed 2 hours and 15 minutes later by the army, with Bardet's division forming the rearguard. The French army was not pursued and reached Valence on 23 March. Thus, the second-largest city in France was seized by the Coalition. This relieved the Allies of all worries about their supply lines. The Allies found 22 guns and 2,500 muskets abandoned in the city. Farther east, Marchand found his division isolated, so he retreated to Grenoble.

The Coalition reported casualties of 72 officers and 2,803 enlisted men. The French reported sustaining only 416 casualties, but a more likely total is 1,000. Gaston Bodart reported that the Allies brought 30,000 troops into action and suffered 1,900 killed and wounded, and 1,000 captured in the actions at Saint-Georges and Limonest. Bodart asserted that the French had 20,000 soldiers and sustained losses of 800 killed and wounded, and 1,200 captured. Digby Smith stated that the Allies lost 1,100 killed and wounded, plus 600 captured out of 30,000 engaged. Smith wrote that the French lost 800 killed and wounded, and 1,200 captured out of 20,000 men and 36 guns engaged.

== Notes ==
Footnotes

Citations
