= Louis François Félix Musnier =

- Born: 18 January 1766; Longueville, Pas-de-Calais, France
- Died: 16 November 1837 (aged 71) Paris, France
- Allegiance: France
- Branch: Infantry
- Service years: 1781–1815, 1831–1832
- Rank: General of Division
- Conflicts: War of the First Coalition; War of the Second Coalition; Battle of Marengo; Battle of Pozzolo; Peninsular War; Siege of Zaragoza; Battle of Alcañiz; Battle of María; Battle of Belchite; Siege of Lérida; Siege of Tortosa; Battle of Saguntum; Siege of Valencia; War of the Sixth Coalition; Battle of Mâcon; Battle of Limonest
- Awards: Légion d'Honneur, GC 1810; Order of Saint Louis, 1814
- Other work: Count of the Empire, 1811

Louis François Félix Musnier de La Converserie (French pronunciation: [lwi fʁɑ̃swa feliks mysnje də la kɔ̃vɛʁsəʁi]; 18 January 1766 – 16 November 1837) became a general officer during the French Revolutionary Wars and led a division during the Napoleonic Wars. He joined the French Royal Army as an officer in 1781 after a spell in military school. Still a lieutenant in 1788, he enjoyed rapid promotion during the French Revolution. After serving as a general's aide, he was assigned to fight rebels in the Vendée. Later, he served as Adjutant General on two army staffs. In 1798 he was promoted to general of brigade for distinguished actions in Italy.

In 1800, Musnier led a brigade at Marengo. After a period of relative inactivity in which he was promoted to general of division, he was sent to command a division in Spain. He fought under Bon-Adrien Jeannot de Moncey and Jean-Andoche Junot. In 1809 Louis Gabriel Suchet took command of the corps and led it to a remarkable string of victories. During this period Musnier commanded his division in numerous engagements. In January 1814, he transferred to eastern France to fight the Austrians who were on the verge of capturing Lyon. He carried out a successful bluff until reinforcements arrived to drive the Austrians away. In March he led a division at Mâcon and Limonest. Because he rallied to Napoleon during the Hundred Days, he was retired from the army except for a brief period in 1831–1832. His surname is one of the Names inscribed under the Arc de Triomphe.

== Revolution ==
Born on 18 January 1766 at Longueville, France, Musnier entered the military school of Paris on 22 August 1780 as a gentleman cadet. On 4 January 1781 he was promoted to sous-lieutenant. He joined the Piémont Regiment on 22 December 1782. He was elevated in rank to second lieutenant on 10 August 1788, adjutant-major on 15 September 1791, and captain on 1 March 1792. Musnier became an aide-de-camp to General Alexis Magallon de Lamorlière of the Army of the Rhine in July 1792. The following year, he was assigned to the Army of the West to fight the War in the Vendée. On 27 March 1795 he was named chef de bataillon (major) of the 1st Battalion of the 106th Line Infantry Demi Brigade.

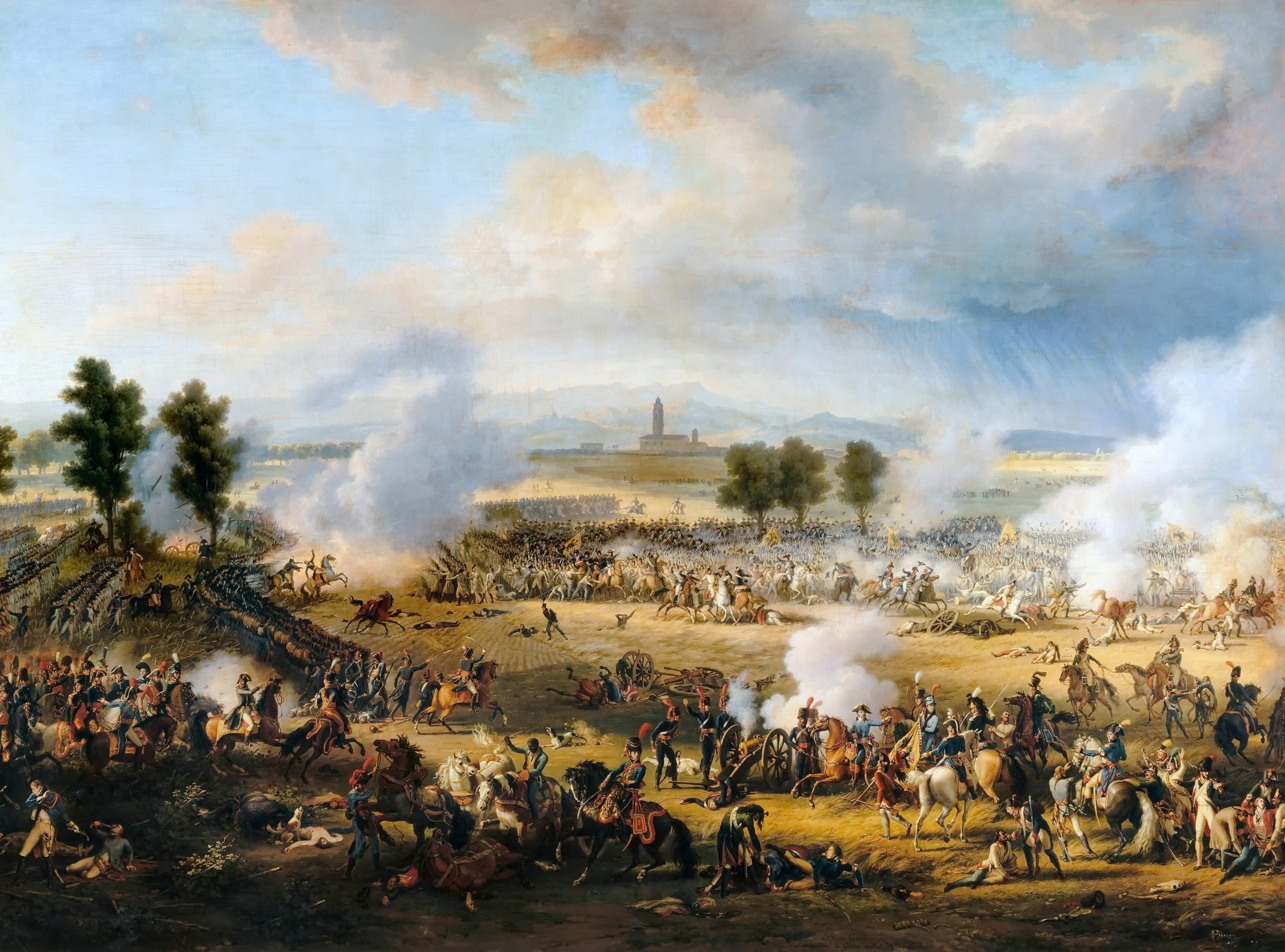
The Battle of Marengo by Louis-François Lejeune. Boudet's division and Kellermann's cavalry attack the Austrians at the crisis of the Battle of Marengo, 14 June 1800.

Musnier became chef de brigade (colonel) of the 187th Line Demi Brigade on 5 September 1795. He transferred on 25 June 1796 to command the 60th Line Demi Brigade. He was named Adjutant General on 18 July 1796. In this capacity, he carried out the functions of the chief of staff for the Army of the North and the Army of Batavia until July 1798. Musnier joined the Army of Italy on 18 October 1798 and performed notable service in the capture of Novara on 5 December 1798. He was rewarded for this action by promotion to general of brigade on 17 December 1798.

He was posted to the division of Jean Boudet for Napoleon Bonaparte's 1800 campaign in Italy. At the Battle of Marengo on 14 June 1800 his brigade consisted of the 9th Light and 30th Line Infantry Demi Brigades. Under the overall direction of Louis Desaix, Boudet's troops arrived late in the afternoon. French soldiers defeated earlier in the day took heart and rallied behind Boudet's fresh troops. Led by the 9th Light, the new French line pushed back the Austrians of the Michael Wallis Infantry Regiment Nr. 11, but recoiled when Austrian chief of staff Anton von Zach sent a brigade of crack grenadiers into the fight. Soon afterward, Desaix led Boudet's division in a general attack. With perfect timing, the French unleashed a ferocious bombardment of the grenadiers just as François Etienne de Kellermann's heavy cavalrymen charged into their flank. Although Desaix was killed, the grenadier brigade was broken and Zach was captured. Subsequently, the Austrians withdrew from the field, conceding defeat.

Still in the Army of Italy, Musnier fought at the Battle of Pozzolo on 25 December 1800. He was deactivated on 23 September 1801, but assigned to command the 15th Military Division on 14 November that year.

== Empire ==
=== Invasion of Spain ===
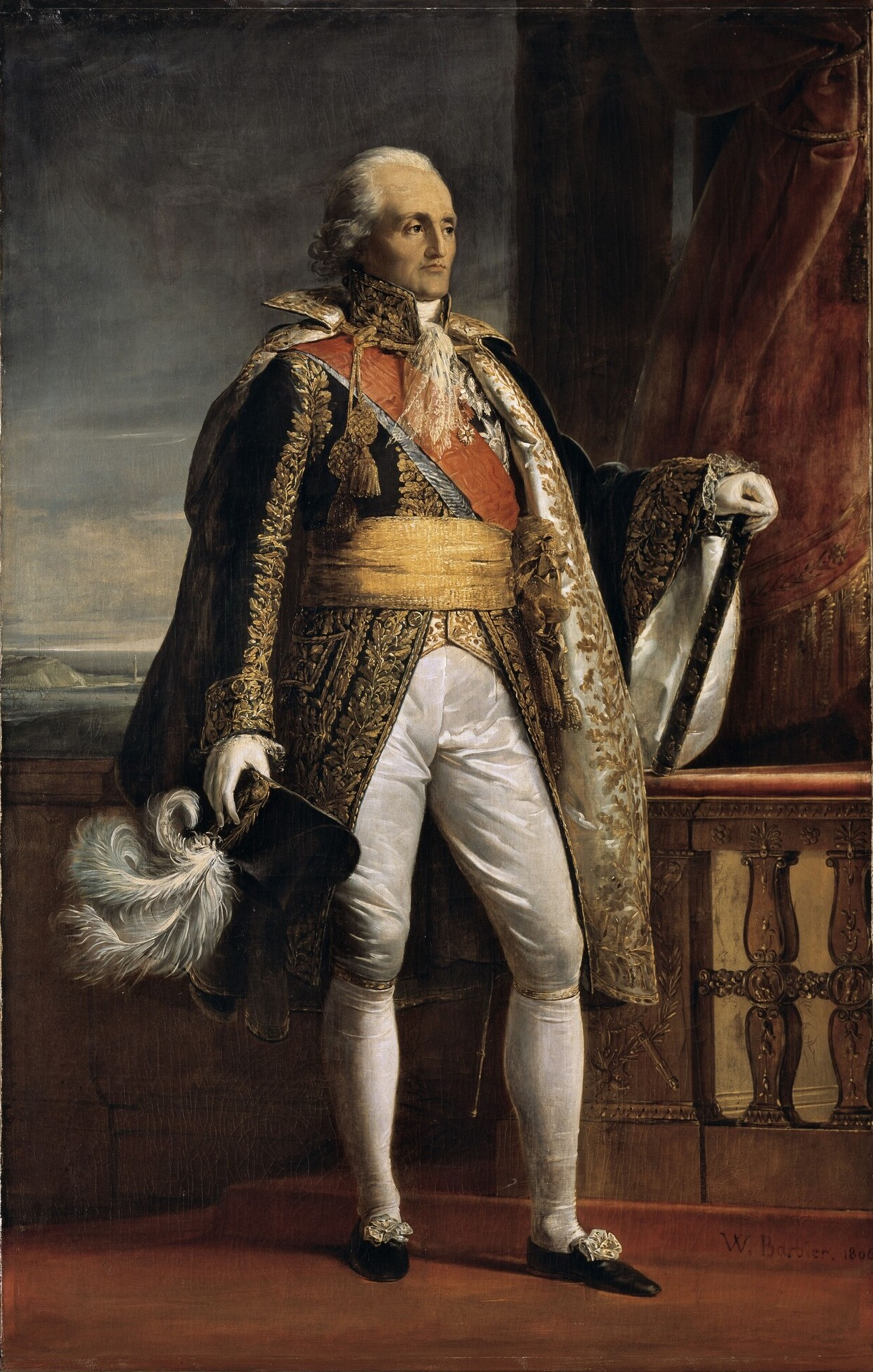
Bon-Adrien de Moncey

Musnier became a Member of the Légion d'Honneur on 11 December 1803 and a Commander of the Légion on 14 June 1804. He was promoted to general of division on 1 February 1805. The year 1807 found him employed in coast defence in France. At this time Napoleon made the unwise decision to seize Spain by force and expel King Charles IV and his royal family. Using various pretexts, he introduced 70,000 French troops into Spain. On 16 February 1808, the French armies seized control of a number of important places and soon afterward sent the Spanish ruling family to be detained in France. On 2 May 1808, Spain exploded in revolt against the French occupation forces, initiating the Peninsular War. Among the first French forces in Spain, Musnier commanded the 1st Division in the 24,430-strong corps of Marshal Bon-Adrien Jeannot de Moncey. His division numbered 9,700 soldiers in 17 battalions.

Ordered to put down the insurrection in Valencia, Moncey reached that city on 26 June 1808 with 9,000 troops. Two days later, he assaulted the city in the Battle of Valencia. Repulsed with 1,000 casualties, Moncey abandoned the effort and fell back toward Madrid in early July. On 1 August, the French evacuated Madrid and withdrew behind the Ebro River in northeast Spain. For Napoleon's second invasion of Spain, Moncey's command was renamed the III Corps and reinforced to a strength of 37,690 men. Musnier led the 2nd Division.

In the first Siege of Zaragoza during the summer of 1808, the French attackers had been defeated. On 19 December 1808, Moncey began the second Siege of Zaragoza. For the effort, the marshal massed 38,000 infantry, 3,000 artillerists and sappers, 3,500 cavalry, and 144 guns. The French were opposed by 34,000 Spanish regulars, 10,000 militia, and 160 guns. Musnier's 3,544-man 2nd Division comprised three battalions each of the French 114th and 115th Line Infantry Regiments, and two battalions of the Polish 1st Legion of the Vistula. The city had to be taken house by house against desperate resistance. After losing 10,000 soldiers killed, wounded, or died of disease, the French captured the city on 20 February 1809. The Spanish suffered even heavier losses, including 34,000 civilians dead, mostly from disease.

=== Fighting in Aragon ===
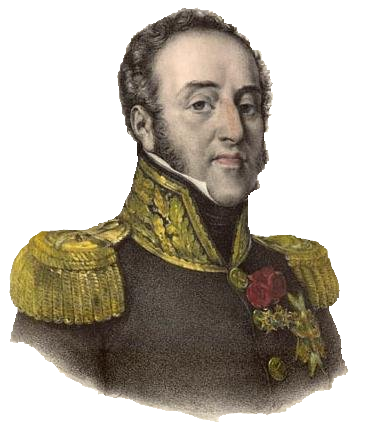
Louis Gabriel Suchet

The III Corps, now under General of Division Jean-Andoche Junot, overran the southern part of Aragon after the fall of Zaragoza. However, Spanish guerillas became active again, forcing the French to abandon some districts. Since war with Austria was imminent, Napoleon withdrew half of Aragon's occupation forces. At this time, Junot was replaced in command by General of Division Louis Gabriel Suchet. A Spanish army under General Joaquín Blake y Joyes appeared and threatened French control of Aragon.

Suchet attacked the Spanish army in the Battle of Alcañiz on 23 May 1809. The French army had 7,292 infantry in 14 battalions, 526 cavalry in six squadrons, and 18 guns. Blake's force was made up of 8,101-foot soldiers, 445 horsemen, and 19 artillery pieces. Musnier's 2nd Division included the same units as at Zaragoza plus one battalion of the 121st Line. General of Division Anne-Gilbert Laval's 1st Division only mustered four battalions. Blake deployed his troops on high ground in front of Alcañiz. Laval probed the Spanish right flank, then Suchet ordered Musnier to attack Blake's center. Musnier formed the five battalions of the 114th Line and the 1st Vistula Legion into a massive 2,600-man column and launched it at Blake's line. All 19 Spanish guns played on this formation and musketry as well. Under this fire, the French and Poles were halted and then fled. Suchet, who was wounded, immediately withdrew from the field. The III Corps suffered 800 casualties, while Blake counted only 300 killed and wounded. The defeat caused Suchet to abandon much of Aragon, while Blake was swamped by 25,000 new recruits, most of whom he could not supply with weapons.

After his victory, Blake advanced on Zaragoza with 20,000 men divided into three divisions. He advanced down the Huerva River with one division on the right bank and two divisions on the left bank. Leaving Laval and a 2,000-man brigade to observe the Spanish right bank division, Suchet confronted Blake in the Battle of María on 15 June 1809. The French general deployed Musnier on his right and General of Brigade Pierre-Joseph Habert's 1st Division brigade on his left. Suchet expected some troops to arrive later in the day and planned to stall for time. Blake struck at Musnier's division but the 114th Line beat back the attack with help from a Polish lancer regiment. Suchet ordered a counterattack but the combat was halted by a hail storm. At length, the French reinforcements arrived and Suchet launched Habert and Pierre Watier's cavalry at Blake's right wing. The Spanish line crumbled, but Blake was able to withdraw in relatively good order, though he lost 16 of his 25 guns. The French and Poles lost 700 or 800 casualties out of 10,000 infantry, 800 cavalry, and 12 guns. The Spanish suffered losses of 1,000 killed, 3,000 to 4,000 wounded, and hundreds captured out of 14,000-foot soldiers and 1,000 horsemen. Musnier's division was the same as at Zaragoza, with the addition of one battalion of the 2nd Reserve Legion.

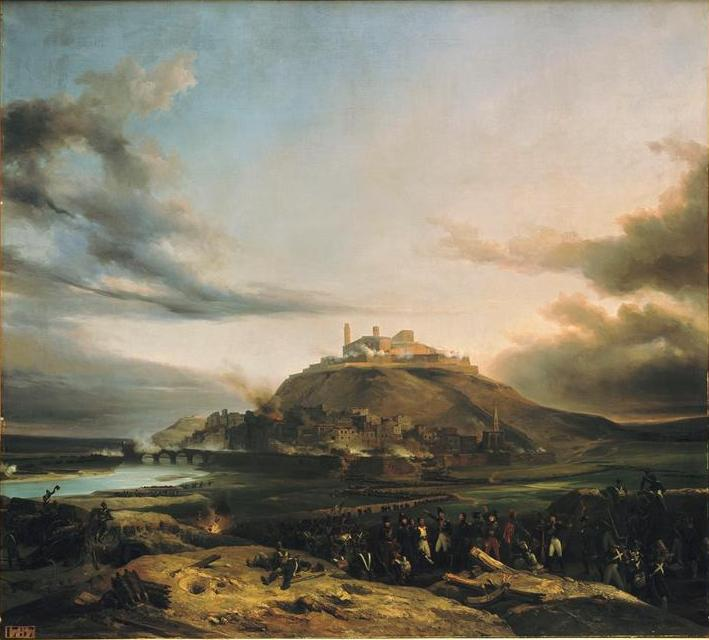
Siege of Lérida, 1810

On 18 June 1809, Blake made a stand in the Battle of Belchite. The Spanish army formed on some hills in front of the town of Belchite. Suchet paid no attention to Blake's center while sending Musnier to attack the Spanish left and Habert to assault the right. Musnier's troops made some progress, driving back Blake's left wing. Just as Habert struck on the other flank, a lucky hit blew up the Spanish ammunition stores. At this, Blake's men panicked and fled the field. Suchet left Musnier to watch Blake's force and returned to Zaragoza to restore order in Aragon. The Spanish lost 2,000 casualties out of 11,000 infantry and 870 cavalry, plus all nine of their artillery pieces. French losses were only 200 killed and wounded. Musnier spent the rest of the year pacifying the southern part of Aragon. He scored a few successes but the guerillas learned to avoid major concentrations of French troops.

In January 1810, the 23,140-man III Corps was organized into three infantry divisions under Laval, Musnier, and Habert, and a cavalry brigade under General of Brigade André Joseph Boussart. With 11 battalions and 7,173 effectives, Musnier's 2nd Division was the largest formation in the corps. Suchet planned to operate against Mequinenza and Lérida. Instead, King Joseph Bonaparte ordered him to advance against Valencia. Because Joseph's forces were in the process of overrunning Andalusia against spotty resistance, the king believed that the Spanish armies were in a state of collapse. Reluctantly, Suchet set out for Valencia and reached there on 6 March. He found its Spanish defenders full of fight and found it necessary to abandon the futile mission four days later. Back in Aragon, Suchet spent some time suppressing guerillas before moving against Lérida. He arrived before the city on 15 April. After finding that General Henry O'Donnell was marching to the city's relief, Suchet took Musnier's division and went looking for the hostile army. The two forces missed each other and Musnier returned to the vicinity of Lérida on the night of 22 April.

The next morning, Miguel Ibarrola Gonzáles encountered Jean Isidore Harispe's small covering force east of Lérida. Harispe called for help and when Musnier showed up with his division, Ibarrola quickly fell back to the hamlet of Margalef with Musnier in aggressive pursuit. In the Battle of Margalef, as the Spanish troops faced Musnier's infantry, the 13th Cuirassier Regiment charged into their flank. Ibarrola's formations were cut to pieces. When O'Donnell appeared with a second division, the French heavy cavalrymen overran his rear guard. Out of 5,500-foot soldiers and 500 horsemen, the French reported only 100 casualties, all from the cuirassiers. O'Donnell lost 500 men killed and wounded plus 2,000 soldiers and three guns captured out of a total of 7,000 infantry, 300 cavalry, and six guns. In addition to the heavy cavalry, Musnier's force included three battalions each of the 114th and 115th Line, two battalions of the 1st Vistula Legion, the 4th Hussars, and two foot artillery batteries. The Siege of Lérida ended with the French capture of the city in mid-May.

=== Invading Valencia ===
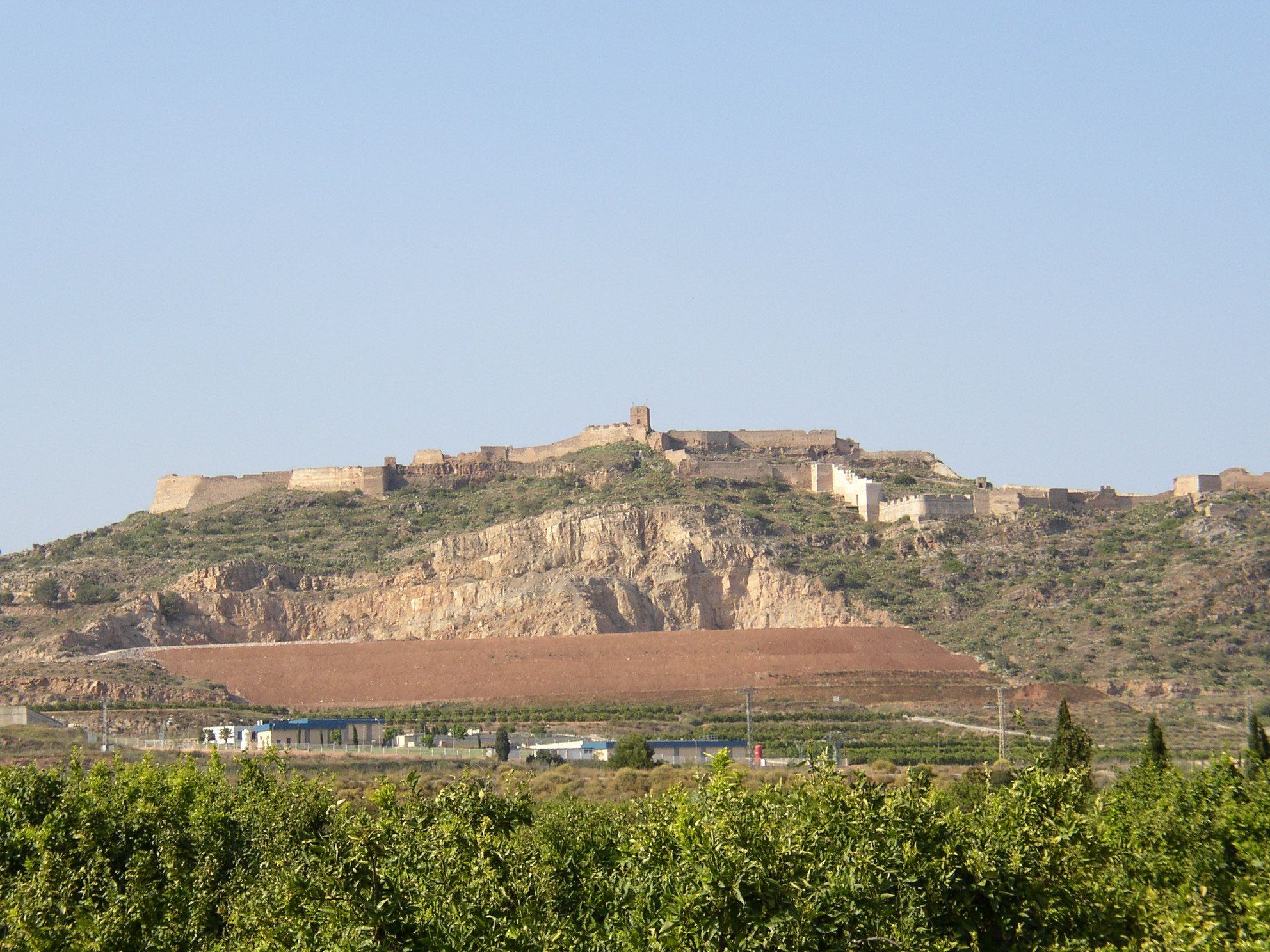
Castle of Saguntum

Siege of Mequinenza lasted less than a month, falling to Suchet on 5 June 1810. Musnier's division was involved in the operation. Its composition was the same as at Lérida plus three battalions of the 121st Line. Musnier was appointed Grand Officer of the Légion d'Honneur on 28 August 1810. From 16 December 1810 to 2 January 1811, Musnier led his division in the Siege of Tortosa which ended in a Spanish surrender. His division's organization was the same as at Mequinenza except that the 1st Light replaced the 115th Line. Musnier was named Baron of the Empire on 20 January 1811.

Musnier missed the Siege of Tarragona in May and June 1811. A muster roll from 15 July 1811 showed his 1st Division to number 7,689 men in 11 battalions. He fought at the Battle of Saguntum on 25 October. His 4,829-man division consisted of brigades under Louis Benoît Robert and Florentin Ficatier. After the battle, he was briefly responsible for defending Aragon before he rejoined the main army. He led his division at the Siege of Valencia in December 1811 and January 1812. This operation resulted in the capitulation of Blake with 16,270 men and 374 guns. The 1st Division was made up of three battalions each of the 114th and 121st Line and two battalions each of the 1st and 2nd Vistula Legions.

At the Battle of Castalla on 13 April 1813, Robert commanded the 1st Division in Musnier's absence. In June 1813, Musnier's division included 4,163 men in seven battalions. This unit missed the Battle of Ordal on 13 September 1813. By late 1813, Musnier's division had shrunk to 3,561 troops in six battalions.

=== Late Empire ===
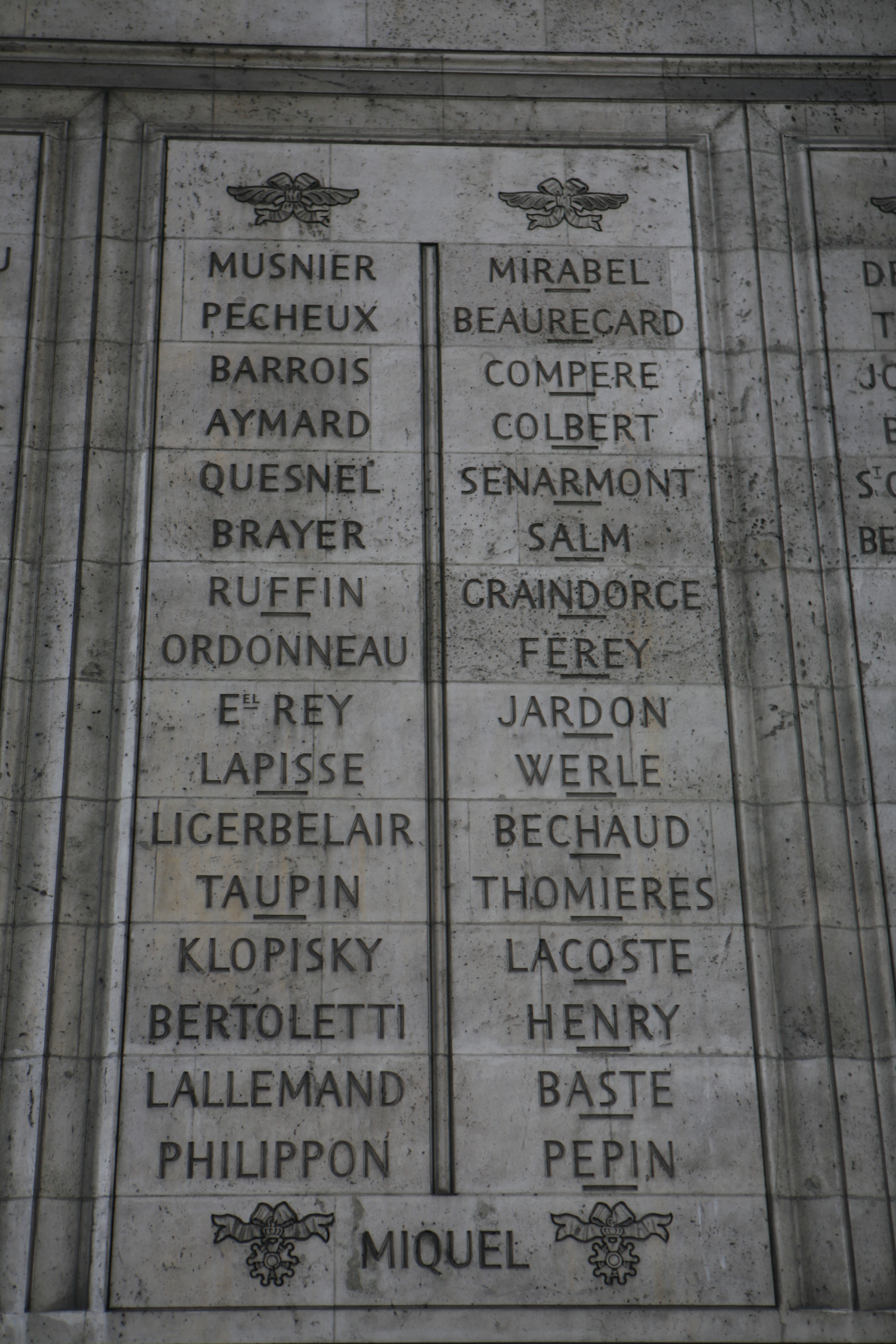
Musnier is among the names inscribed under the Arc de Triomphe (see top of left column).

In late 1813 Musnier was recalled to France where he inspected fortresses. On 23 December he was given command of the Geneva reserve. In January 1814, he was attached to Marshal Pierre Augereau's command which was based at Lyon. On 14 January, Musnier had only 1,200 soldiers and 500 conscripts to defend the city of Lyon. His superior Marshal Pierre Augereau left Musnier to cope with the situation and rode to Valence to gather more troops. By 16 January, Austrian patrols were lurking outside the walls of Lyon. Believing his soldiers might run away, Musnier moved them to the west bank of the Saône River on 17 January, evacuating the city. Austrian commander Ferdinand, Graf Bubna von Littitz heard about this and sent an officer to demand Lyon's surrender. When the Austrian parliamentary arrived, a mob formed nearby and began threatening to fling him in the river. Keeping up the bluff, Musnier talked up his strength and exaggerated the fury of the city's residents. Completely fooled, the Austrian officer's report to his superior caused Bubna to pause in his plan to storm the city. Musnier reoccupied Lyon and held it through 18–19 January. Late on the 19th, 1,200 French troops arrived from Valence and drove the Austrians out of the suburbs. Musnier's actions averted the early capture of Lyon and allowed the French to pose a threat to the main Allied armies' supply lines.

With 6,000 men, Musnier sparred with Bubna's forces. On 17 February 1814 he fought a skirmish with Joseph Klopstein von Ennsbruck's Austrians. On 11 March, he was defeated at Mâcon by Frederick Bianchi, Duke of Casalanza and 8,000 Austrians. His force of 6,000 men included elements of the 32nd Light and 20th, 23rd, and 67th Line Infantry Regiments, 13th Cuirassiers, 12th Hussars, and National Guard of Toulon. The French lost 800 killed and wounded, plus 500 men and two guns captured. Austrian losses were 450 killed and wounded, and 450 captured. Musnier led his division at the Battle of Limonest on 20 March. When an Austrian brigade advanced from an unexpected direction he found his division outflanked and withdrew. With 56,000 soldiers and 124 cannon, the Austrians enjoyed a large numerical superiority over the French army's 20,786 infantry, 1,976 cavalry and 1,507 gunners with 33 field guns. The French inflicted 3,000 casualties on their enemies while losing only 1,000, but still lost Lyon.

== Retirement ==
Musnier accepted the return of King Louis XVIII who awarded him the Order of Saint Louis on 27 June 1814. During the Hundred Days he transferred his allegiance to Napoleon, who gave him responsibility for the 10th, 11th, and 20th Military Divisions on 28 May 1815. He was retired from the army in September and remained so for 15 years. He was placed in the reserve on 17 February 1831 and his final retirement occurred on 1 March 1832. He died in Paris on 16 November 1837. MUSNIER is engraved on the Western pillar on Column 37 of the Arc de Triomphe.

== Bibliography ==
- Arnold, James R. (2005). Marengo & Hohenlinden. Barnsley, South Yorkshire, UK: Pen & Sword. ISBN 1-84415-279-0.
- Gates, David (2002). The Spanish Ulcer: A History of the Peninsular War. London: Pimlico. ISBN 0-7126-9730-6.
- Broughton, Tony (2001). "French Infantry Regiments and the Colonels who Led Them: 1791 to 1815 Part VI". The Napoleon Series.
- Leggiere, Michael V. (2007). The Fall of Napoleon: The Allied Invasion of France 1813-1814. Vol. 1. New York, N.Y.: Cambridge University Press. ISBN 978-0-521-87542-4.
- Mullié, Charles (1852). Biographie des célébrités militaires des armées de terre et de mer de 1789 a 1850 (in French).
- Nafziger, George (2015). The End of Empire: Napoleon's 1814 Campaign. Solihull, UK: Helion & Company. ISBN 978-1-909982-96-3.
- Smith, Digby (1998). The Napoleonic Wars Data Book. London: Greenhill. ISBN 1-85367-276-9.
