= Battle of Saint-Julien (1814) =

1814 battle during the War of the Sixth Coalition

- Part of the Campaign of France of the Sixth Coalition
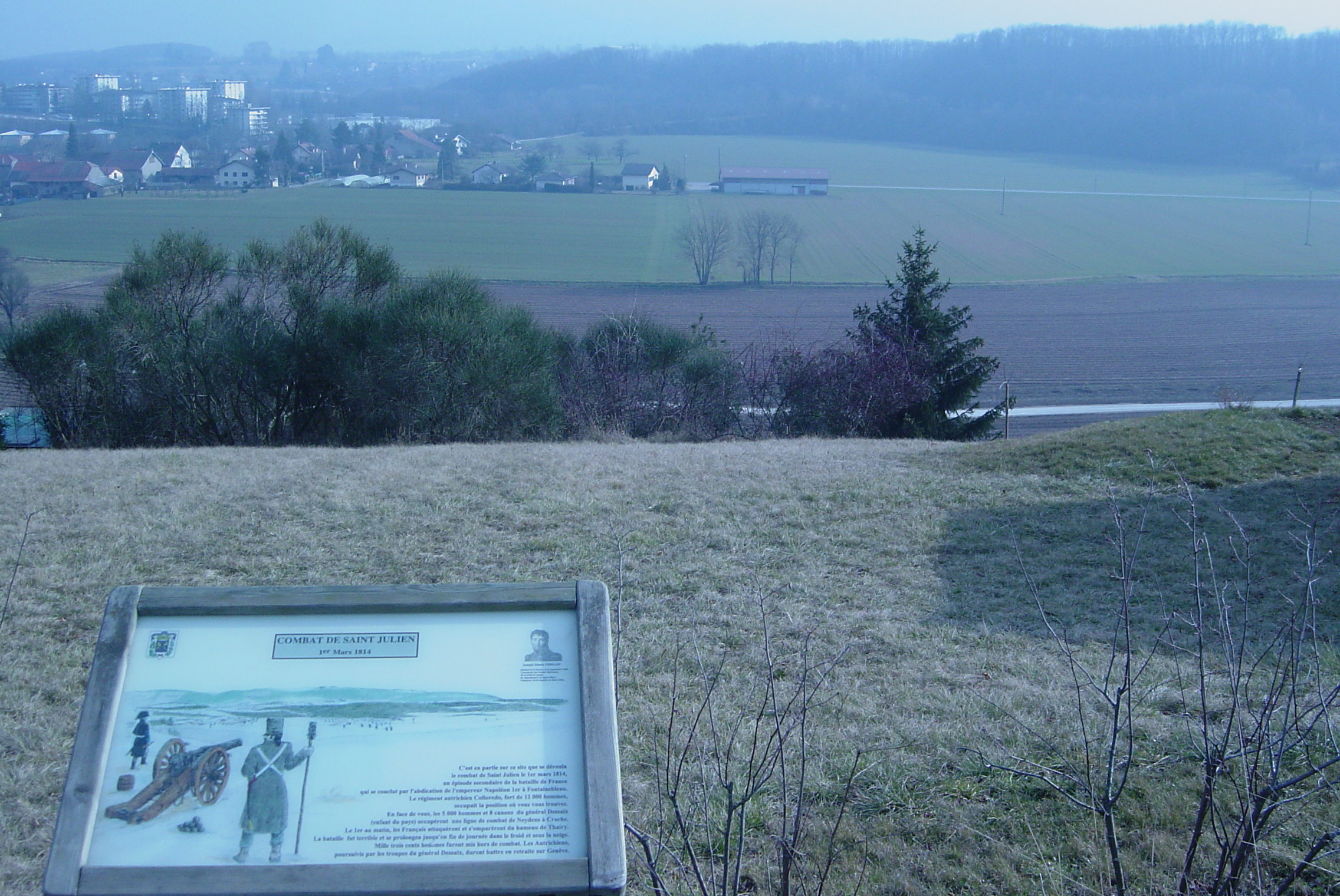
- Historical marker in front of the battlefield of Saint-Julien
Date	1 March 1814
Location	Saint-Julien-en-Genevois, French Empire 46°08′37″N 6°04′52″E
Result	Austrian victory

Belligerents
(First French Empire) France	(Austrian Empire) Austria

Commanders and leaders
(First French Empire) Pierre Augereau (First French Empire) Jean Gabriel Marchand	(Austrian Empire) Ferdinand von Bubna (Austrian Empire) Johann Nepomuk von Klebelsberg

Strength
4,800 (Note: Only Marchand's engaged force.); 13 guns	5,600–6,000; 29 guns

Casualties and losses
1,300 killed, wounded, or captured 5 guns lost	650 killed, wounded, or captured
- Location within France

War of the Sixth Coalition:
Campaign in north-east France
current battle
Napoleon in command
Napoleon not in command

The Battle of Saint-Julien (1 March 1814) saw Imperial French troops led by Jean Gabriel Marchand attack Austrian soldiers under Johann Nepomuk von Klebelsberg. In tough fighting, the Austrians managed to hold off persistent French assaults during this War of the Sixth Coalition clash. The next day, the Austrians withdrew within the defenses of Geneva, a distance of 9 kilometres (6 mi) to the northeast. The battle was part of operations in which a French army led by Marshal Pierre Augereau squared off against Austrian forces under Ferdinand, Graf Bubna von Littitz.

The 1814 Campaign in Northeast France pitted Emperor Napoleon against the main Allied armies of Field Marshals Karl Philipp, Prince of Schwarzenberg and Gebhard Leberecht von Blücher to the east of Paris. Meanwhile, a lesser campaign was fought around Lyon and Geneva to the south. In January 1814 the Austrians seized Geneva and occupied vast tracts of eastern France, but they failed to capture Lyon. In mid-February, Pierre Augereau launched an offensive from Lyon toward the north to recapture territory. On his extreme right flank, Marchand's division recaptured parts of Savoie and advanced to the gates of Geneva, which was an important Austrian base. Alarmed for the safety of his supply line to Germany, Schwarzenberg quickly dispatched massive forces to guard his southern flank.

== Invasion ==
=== Geneva falls ===
Rather than directly invading France from the east across the Rhine, the Army of Bohemia under Karl Philipp, Prince of Schwarzenberg moved south into Switzerland. On 21 December 1813, Austrian formations of the army crossed the Rhine at Basel, Grenzach, Laufenburg and Schaffhausen while Swiss military units stood aside. Once across the Rhine, the Army of Bohemia executed a right wheel and plunged across Swiss territory into France.

Among the formations in the army were Ferdinand, Graf Bubna von Littitz's 1st Light Division consisting of 6,388 troops and 24 artillery pieces, Hieronymus von Colloredo-Mansfeld's I Corps comprising 15,708 men and 64 field pieces and Alois von Liechtenstein's II Corps including 12,708 troops and 64 guns. Prince Frederick of Hesse-Homburg led the Austrian Reserve Corps which consisted of two elite infantry divisions and two cuirassier divisions, a total of 18,500 men and 100 guns. The German VI Corps under Prince Philipp of Hesse-Homburg initially numbered 9,250 soldiers from Hesse-Darmstadt, Frankfurt, Isenburg, Reuss and Würzburg. It mustered at Frankfurt am Main before leaving for France in January with 13,000 soldiers and 16 field pieces.

When Bubna reached Geneva on 30 December 1813, its French commander promptly had a paralyzing stroke and his 1,500-man garrison quickly surrendered to the Austrians. Geneva's arsenal contained 117 heavy guns, 30 field guns and muskets for 1,000 men. Napoleon was so angry at the loss of the city that he threw the prefect in prison, even though a civil commission cleared him of wrongdoing. After his coup, Bubna operated as a practically independent commander. He left Theophil Joseph von Zechmeister in charge of Geneva and captured Bourg-en-Bresse on 11 January 1814. Napoleon assigned Marshal Pierre Augereau to defend Lyon, mount a threat to the Allied south flank and recapture Geneva. On 14 January the emperor ordered Marshal Louis-Gabriel Suchet to send 10,000 infantry plus cavalry from the eastern Pyrenees to help Augereau.

=== Lyon saved ===
Augereau reached Lyon on 14 March where Louis François Félix Musnier informed him that only 1,200 soldiers and 500 raw conscripts were available to defend the city. Leaving Musnier to make the best of a bad situation, Augereau rode to Valence to round up more troops. By 16 January, Austrian patrols lurked outside the walls of Lyon. Believing his shaky soldiers would not be able to hold, Musnier moved them to the west bank of the Saône River on 17 January, evacuating the city. Having got wind of this development, Bubna sent an officer to demand Lyon's surrender. When the Austrian negotiator arrived, a mob gathered nearby and began threatening to throw him in the river. Playing a good bluff, Musnier magnified his own strength and exaggerated the hostility of the city's residents. The hapless Austrian officer's report caused Bubna to reconsider trying to immediately seize the city, which Musnier reoccupied. Even so, Bubna hung around Lyon during 18–19 January. Late on the 19th, 1,200 French troops arrived from Valence and helped drive the Austrians out of the suburbs.

On 20 February, 900 troops and 20 cannon reached Lyon and on the 21st, Augereau returned with 200 cavalry. By this date, Bubna's column had retreated north to Pont-d'Ain; he abandoned Mâcon soon after. Thus, Bubna passed up a splendid opportunity to capture an important city and eliminate a threat to Schwarzenberg's supply line. During this time, Zechmeister invaded Savoie, seizing Aix-les-Bains and Chambéry. The Austrian II Corps began blockading Besançon on 11 January while most of the Army of Bohemia continued moving northwest where it captured Langres on the 17th. The First Battle of Bar-sur-Aube was fought on 24 January and the Battle of Brienne five days later.

== Counteroffensive ==
=== French recovery ===
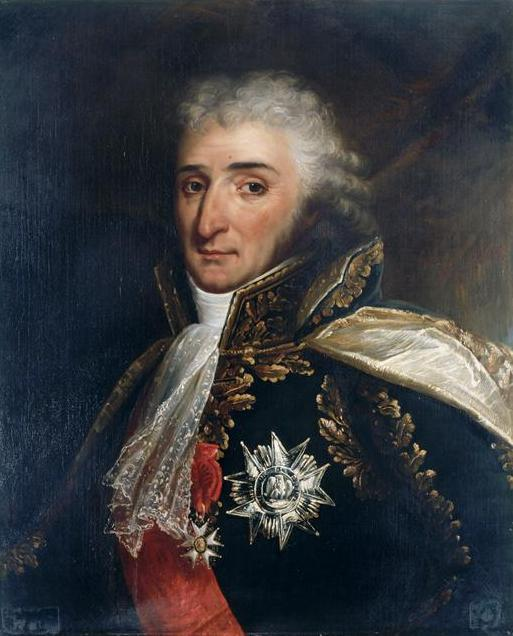
Pierre Augereau

Jean Gabriel Marchand was appointed to defend Savoie with Joseph Marie, Count Dessaix as his deputy. On 25 January, 400 French soldiers with two cannons successfully defended the bridge over the Isère River at Montmélian. On 31 January Zechmeister's Austrians were repelled in an attack on Fort Barreaux in which 10–12 year old boys from the nearby village carried ammunition to the defenders. There was an inconclusive skirmish at Chapareillan on 6 February. The local authorities mobilized National Guards, retired veterans, hunters and customs officers to defend the area. Farther west, Bubna occupied Chalon-sur-Saône without too much trouble and seized Mâcon on 8 February.

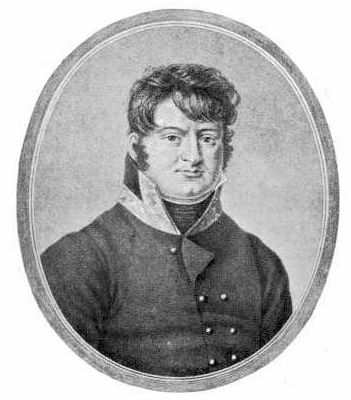
Ferdinand Bubna

By February 1814, reinforcements allowed Augereau to organize his soldiers into four divisions. Claude Marie Pannetier led 4,200 mostly Spanish campaign veterans, Musnier commanded 5,500 veterans from Spain added to the troops holding Lyon, Martial Bardet had 3,500 conscripts with a sprinkling of veteran cadres and Marchand directed 4,800 conscripts formed around several veteran cadres. From left to right, Augereau arranged his divisions in the order Pannetier, Musnier, Bardet and Marchand. The 2,000 French cavalry was led by Alexandre, vicomte Digeon and a reserve was created from 3,000 National Guards that were unfit for front line duty. With these troops Augereau decided to mount an offensive against Bubna's now-outnumbered 12,000 men.

Augereau ordered Musnier and Pannetier to strike northeast from Lyon toward Geneva, where they would meet Marchand outside the city. When the offensive began on 17 February Augereau remained in Lyon issuing orders. Pannetier's division moved north and captured Villefranche-sur-Saône on 18 February and Mâcon the next day, driving 3,000 Austrians before him and taking 300 prisoners. Musnier moved northeast and pushed Joseph Klopstein von Ennsbruck's 1,000 Austrian infantry and 300 cavalry out of Meximieux on the 18th. After seizing Nantua on 19 February, Musnier pursued Klopstein to the north toward Bourg-en-Bresse after rounding up 300 Austrian prisoners. Augereau sent several thousand reserve troops in Musnier's wake. When Klopstein joined him at Bourg, Bubna decided to abandon that town on 20 February. Klopstein's brigade was originally part of the II Corps before being detached to Bubna's command.

On 18 February 1814, Napoleon inflicted a stinging defeat on an Allied corps at the Battle of Montereau. The next day Schwarzenberg decided to retreat to Troyes where he planned to join Blücher and offer battle to Napoleon on 21–22 February. However, during the evening of the 20th he received disturbing news from Prince Frederick of Hesse-Homburg that Augereau and Marchand were advancing in the south. Schwarzenberg detached Frederick Bianchi with the I Corps, a reserve division and additional troops with orders to march rapidly for Dijon. On 23 February the Austrian field marshal continued his retreat though he and Blücher still outnumbered Napoleon 140,000 to 75,000 after subtracting Bianchi's detachment.

The Austrian field marshal's anxiousness is best explained by a letter he received from Emperor Francis I of Austria on 29 January. Francis wrote, "We must not forget that the enemy can, from the South of France, move against our left, where the allies have few men, and that it is very necessary to hold strongly the road which, in case of a check, would serve for retreat". Napoleon wanted Augereau to advance toward Chalon-sur-Saône to carry out the threat that Francis feared. On 21 February, Napoleon sent Augereau a letter urging the marshal to, "pull on his boots of 1793". The emperor wrote, "Count Bubna has no more than 10,000 miserable troops with which to oppose you, which will disappear like a fog before the sun".

=== Marchand's campaign ===
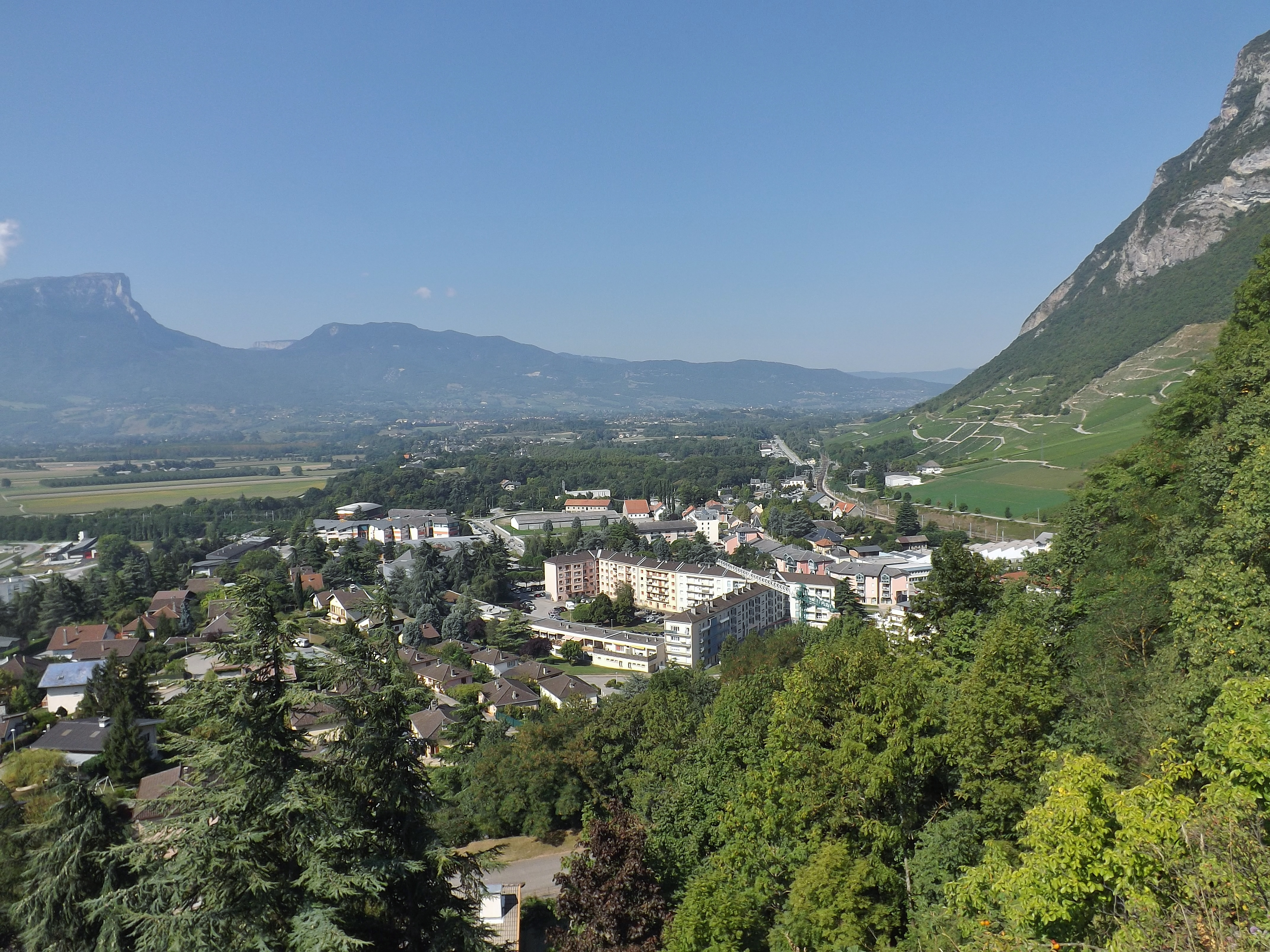
View from Montmélian toward Chambéry

On 15 February Marchand sent 800 troops against the key Echelles Pass. While the voltigeur (light) companies of the 1st Line Infantry Regiment rushed the barricade, the grenadiers of the 1st Line and the carabiniers of the 18th Light stormed the positions on either side. With the pass secured, Marchand's column marched through the next day, headed for Chambéry. Also on 16 February Dessaix with 1,400 soldiers ejected a battalion of the Peterwardeiner Grenz Infantry Regiment from Montmélian and linked up with Marchand. Johann Nepomuk von Klebelsberg rallied the Austrians at Chambéry, but on 19 February he retreated after being outflanked. In January, Klebelsberg commanded the 1st Cuirassier Division in the Austrian Reserve Corps before being transferred. The Austrians took up a position south of Aix-les-Bains with their right flank on the Lake of Bourget with 800 cavalry and 2,200–3,000 infantry. On 22 February, the French ousted Klebelsberg from these defenses with a brilliant cavalry charge.

Napoleon was critical of Augereau's operations, writing, "You are dispersing your forces in many directions - to the points where the enemy is dispersed rather than striking at his heart". The emperor wanted the marshal to assemble his army into a single force and personally lead them. As the French offensive paused, Bubna scrambled to rearrange his troops. He ordered Georg Heinrich von Scheither's brigade to hold Chalon-sur-Saône to the last and sent Klopstein's brigade to help defend Geneva. On 24 February, Marchand's leading brigade under Joseph Serrant left Aix-les-Bains and drove an Austrian force out of Albens where the road forks. Moving up the right fork the next day, Serrant caused Zechmeister to abandon Annecy and pursued him north to Allonzier-la-Caille. Also on 25 February, Klopstein's brigade reached Frangy to form Klebelberg's western flank. Marchand advanced up the left fork and captured Rumilly and Hauteville-sur-Fier, occupying Frangy on 27 February.

== Battle ==
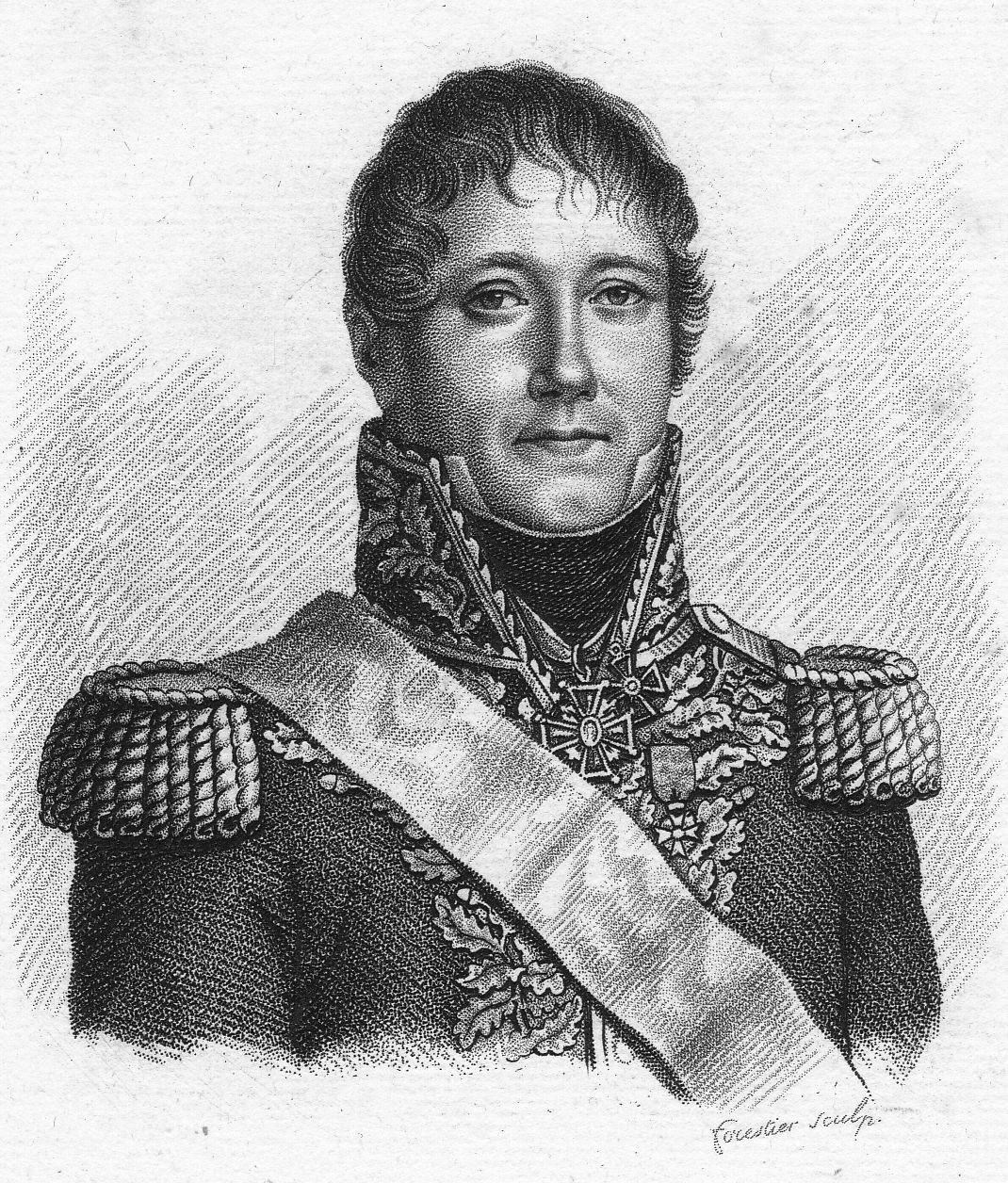
Jean Gabriel Marchand

Klebelsberg controlled 5,600 men in 10 battalions and eight squadrons, supported by 29 guns. Assured by Bubna that he would be sent reinforcements through Switzerland, Klebelsberg arranged his defenses. He deployed Zechmeister on his left at Archamps and Klopstein on his right at Saint-Julien-en-Genevois and Bardonnex. Marchand ordered Serrant to move in the shadow of Mont Salève to outflank Zechmeister. The French general sent Dessaix to attack Klopstein's right flank at the hamlets of Tairier (Thairy) and Turens (Thérens). Marchand would personally direct the center attack directly against Saint-Julien. On 1 March 1814 at 8:00 am, Serrant began pressing back the Warasdiner Kreuzer Grenz Infantry from Le Petit Châble into its main defense line at La Place near Archamps. Two hours later, Dessaix's brigade in three columns drove the Austrians from Viry, Présilly and Songy. A half-battalion of the Wenzel Colloredo Infantry Regiment held up the French advance until being outflanked by one of Dessaix's columns moving from Songy.

As part of his attempt to turn the Austrian right, Dessaix ordered a battalion to move along the Aire stream near Tairier and Crache. To counter this move, the Austrians moved a battalion of the Wenzel Colloredo Regiment to the right flank. Nevertheless, Dessaix captured Crache and Tairier and some nearby high ground. Marchand's center column reached the heights south of Saint-Julien and began to attack the town. This was blocked by three companies each from the Peterwardeiner Grenz and Colloredo Infantry Regiments. Marchand launched a second assault but it was beaten back by a counterattack from two and a half companies from the Vogelsang Infantry Regiment. After this success, the Colloredo and Vogelsang Regiments retook Tairier.

Dessaix fed new battalions into action, but his efforts to roll up the Austrian right were frustrated by five companies of the Kaunitz Infantry Regiment. By nightfall, Dessaix held Tairier and had troops moving along the Turnes ravine. Marchand ordered another assault against Saint-Julien, but his column encountered a battery of 14 Austrian guns, including four 12-pound cannons. The Austrian guns outdueled the French artillery, knocking out two or three of their adversaries' cannons. While both sides camped on the battlefield, Marchand was troubled to find out that his troops had fired off most of their ammunition. He worried that he might have to retreat 100 kilometres (62 mi) to Fort Barraux to resupply his division.

== Aftermath ==
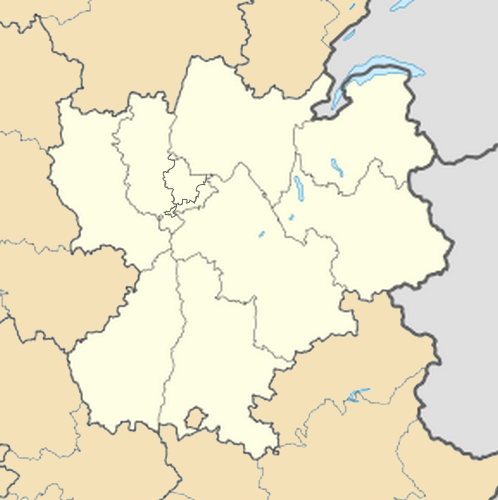
1814 Campaign in the South

The action was a tactical Austrian victory. The victors inflicted 1,200–1,400 casualties on the French while sustaining only 650 casualties. Another authority stated that the French lost 1,000 killed and wounded and 300 captured out of 11,000 while the Austrians lost 650 men out of 6,000. The French also lost five field pieces. Meanwhile, Augereau had sent Bardet's division to join Marchand via Bellegarde-sur-Valserine. Marchand was spared from retreating when Bardet captured Fort l'Écluse and advanced along the north bank of the Rhône River toward Geneva. Alarmed at this incursion, Bubna quickly ordered Klebelsberg to pull back from Saint-Julien to Geneva. Marchand was able to obtain ammunition from the stocks at Fort l'Écluse.

In late February, Pannetier's division and Digeon's cavalry occupied Lons-le-Saulnier and chased the Austrians to Poligny. Augereau set up his headquarters in Lons-le-Saulnier and ordered Musnier to join him after detaching two battalions to Bardet's division. Augereau intended to strike east through Morez to Nyon on the shore of Lake Geneva. By 2 March his advance guard was in Morez in the Jura Mountains. When he heard that Augereau's column reached Saint-Cergue near Nyon, Bubna realized he must either prepare to be besieged in Geneva or take the field, risking the loss of the city. He sent his cavalry far to the rear at Yverdon-les-Bains. Bardet's division occupied Saint-Genis-Pouilly on the west side of Geneva while Marchand held the south bank of the Arve River.

Erroneously believing that Marchand and Bardet could easily capture Geneva, Augereau recalled Musnier's division from Champagnole. He gathered together the divisions of Pannetier, Musnier and Digeon and prepared to march northeast to Besançon where he planned to defeat Liechtenstein's II Corps. Hearing of the French change of strategy, Bubna stayed in Geneva, knowing that Marchand did not have sufficient means to capture the place. The 40,000-strong Army of the South under Bianchi made its appearance on 4 March when its leading echelons arrived in Chalon-sur-Saône. A second column under Maximilian Alexander von Wimpffen attacked Poligny while a third column led by Prince Philipp of Hesse-Homburg occupied Dole. Augereau relinquished all his gains and rapidly retreated to Lyon in order to protect that city.

== Forces ==
=== Austrian Order of Battle: 1 March 1814 ===
1st Lieutenancy: Feldmarschall-Leutnant Ferdinand Bubna von Littitz

- Division: Feldmarschall-Leutnant Ferdinand Bubna von Littitz
  - Brigade: General-major Theophil Joseph von Zechmeister
    - 6th Jager Battalion
    - Broder Grenz Infantry Regiment Nr. 7, one battalion
    - Liechtenstein Hussar Regiment Nr. 7, six squadrons
    - Horse artillery battery, six 6-pounders
  - Brigade: General-major Joseph Klopstein von Ennsbruck
    - Kaunitz Infantry Regiment Nr. 20, three battalions
    - Wenzel Colloredo Infantry Regiment Nr. 56, three battalions
    - Foot artillery battery, eight 6-pounders
- Division: Feldmarschall-Leutnant Johann Nepomuk von Klebelsberg
  - Peterwardeiner Grenz Infantry Regiment Nr. 9, one battalion
  - Levenehr Dragoon Regiment Nr. 4, two squadrons
  - Horse artillery battery, six 6-pounders
- Geneva garrison:
  - Reuss-Greiz Infantry Regiment Nr. 18, three battalions
  - Levenehr Dragoon Regiment Nr. 4, four squadrons
  - Blankenstein Hussar Regiment Nr. 6, six squadrons
  - Foot artillery battery, composition not stated
- Reserve artillery: Foot artillery battery, six 12-pounders

Source: Nafziger 2015, pp. 554–555, 641
Source of regimental numbers: Pivka 1979, pp. 82–84, 89–91

=== French Order of Battle: 15–16 February 1814 ===
General of Division Jean Gabriel Marchand
General of Division Joseph Marie Dessaix

- General of Brigade Joseph Serrant (5,206)
  - 8th Light Infantry Regiment, one battalion, 430 men
  - 18th Light Infantry Regiment, 3rd Battalion, 718 men
  - 26th Light Infantry Regiment, 3rd Battalion, 320 men
  - 1st Line Infantry Regiment, 3rd Battalion, 400 men
  - 5th Line Infantry Regiment, 4th Battalion, 443 men
  - 7th Line Infantry Regiment, one battalion, 320 men
  - 11th Line Infantry Regiment, 4th Battalion, 393 men
  - 23rd Line Infantry Regiment, 3rd Battalion, 243 men
  - 60th Line Infantry Regiment, 4th Battalion, 428 men
  - 79th Line Infantry Regiment, 7th Battalion, 405 men
  - 81st Line Infantry Regiment, 7th Battalion, 483 men
  - Customs Guards, 160 men
  - 4th and 31st Chasseurs à Cheval, 103 men
  - Volunteer gunners, 110 men
- Division: General of Brigade Martial Bardet (4,325 men) arrived 2 March
  - 23rd Light Infantry Regiment, 6th Battalion, 730 men
  - 20th Line Infantry Regiment, 6th Battalion, 647 men
  - 60th Line Infantry Regiment, 6th Battalion, 721 men
  - 67th Line Infantry Regiment, 6th Battalion, 665 men
  - 79th Line Infantry Regiment, 6th Battalion, 721 men
  - 115th Line Infantry Regiment, 6th Battalion, 841 men

Source: Nafziger 2015, pp. 611–612, 639
