= Ignaz Freiherr von Lederer =

Austrian field marshal (1769–1849)

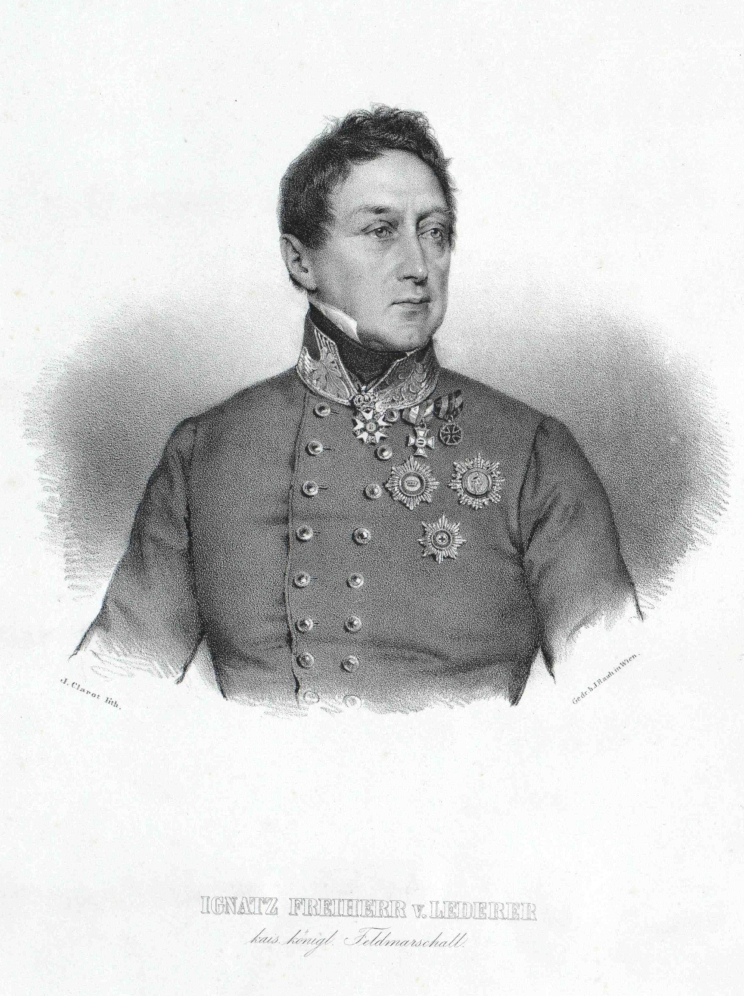
Ignaz Freiherr von Lederer

Ignaz Freiherr von Lederer (Vienna, 25 August 1769 – Hütteldorf, Vienna 10 September 1849) was an Austrian Field Marshal.

== Biography ==
He was the son of Freiherr August Gottlob von Lederer and joined the Imperial Army in 1784. He fought in the French Revolutionary Wars and distinguished himself in the Battles of Ratisbon, Aspern and Wagram.

Promoted to Feldmarschall-Lieutenant in 1813, he led a division in the War of the Sixth Coalition. In the Battle of Leipzig, he fought on the left bank of the Pleiße, under command of Louis William, Landgrave of Hesse-Homburg. After crossing the Rhine, he commanded the avant-garde of the southern Army, and gained victories at Saint-Georges, Limonest and Saint-Romans. He received the Knight's Cross in the Military Order of Maria Theresa. In June 1815, he participated in the siege of the city of Belfort, under command of General Colloredo-Mansfeld.

After the war, he served as a divisional commander in Italy until 1828, then in Moravia. In 1830, he was promoted to General of the Cavalry, and was stationed as military commander, first in Galicia and then in Hungary (1832-1848).

When the Hungarian Revolution of 1848 broke out, the then almost 80-year old general asked to be replaced. His request was granted and he was promoted to Field Marshal. He died the next year.

He married Franzisca Xaveria von Trattnern (1785-1856), and had 3 sons.

== Sources ==
- Austrian Generals (1792-1815)
- BLKÖ
- Deutsche biographie
- Bavarikon
- Geni
