= Frederick VI of Hesse-Homburg =

Frederick VI
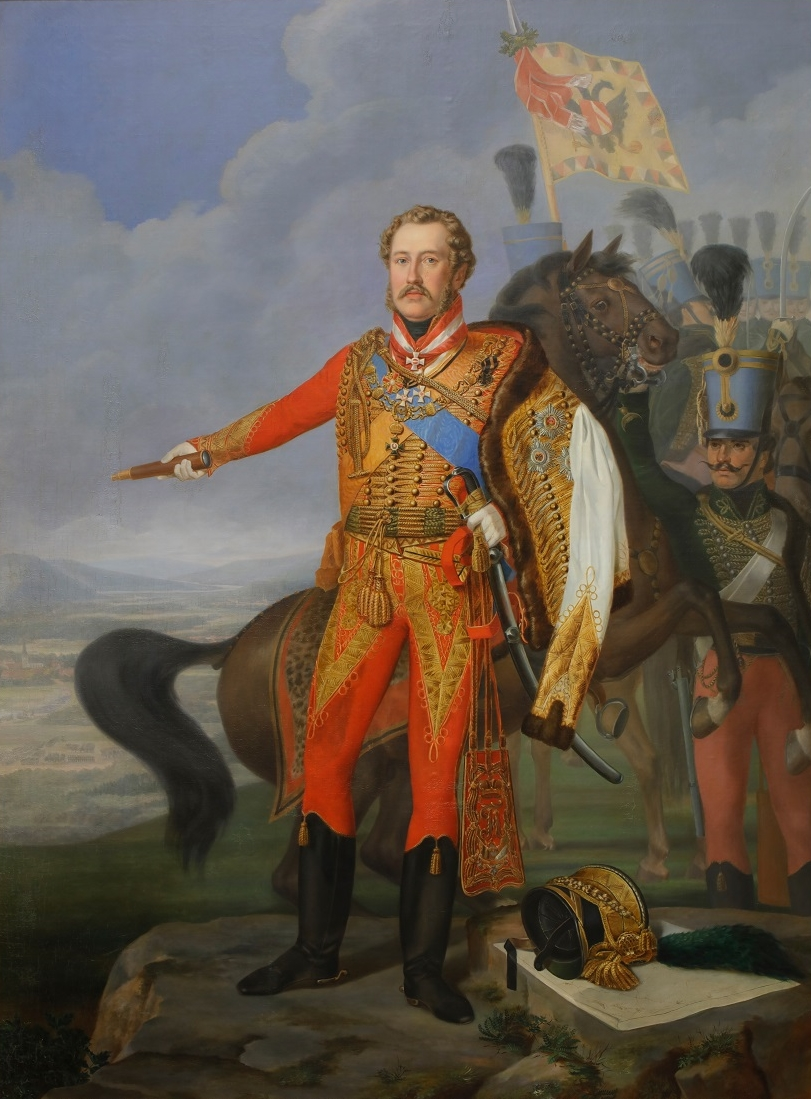
- Portrait of Frederick depicting the capture of the city of Lyon in March 1814

Landgrave of Hesse-Homburg
- Reign: 20 January 1820 - 2 April 1829
- Predecessor: Frederick V
- Successor: Louis William
- Born: 30 July 1769; Bad Homburg vor der Höhe, Hesse
- Died: 2 April 1829 (aged 59); Bad Homburg vor der Höhe, Hesse
- Burial: 10 April 1829; Mausoleum of the Landgraves, Homburg
- Spouse: Princess Elizabeth of the United Kingdom (m. 1818)
- House: Hesse-Homburg
- Father: Frederick V, Landgrave of Hesse-Homburg
- Mother: Caroline of Hesse-Darmstadt

Frederick VI (30 July 1769 – 2 April 1829) reigned as Landgrave of Hesse-Homburg from 1820 until his death in 1829.

== Biography ==
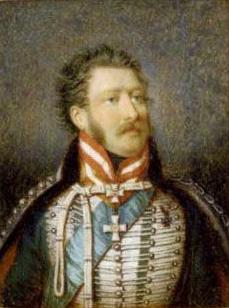
Portrait of Frederick VI by Giovanni Trossarelli, c. 1820–25

Born in Homburg, Hesse, on 30 July 1769, Friedrich Joseph Ludwig Carl August was the eldest son of the incumbent Landgrave of Hesse-Homburg, Frederick V, and his wife Caroline of Hesse-Darmstadt, the eldest child of the then Landgrave of Hesse-Darmstadt, Louis IX.

Frederick was appointed a captain of the Russian cavalry in 1783 and was made an Austrian general during the Great French War. He fought in the Battle of Stockach (1799), Hohenlinden (1800), Wagram (1809), Aspern-Essling (1809), Dresden (1813), Mâcon and Limonest (1814) and reached the rank of General of the cavalry (Austria).
For his services in that conflict, he was created a Commander of the Austrian Military Order of Maria Theresa and also received the Prussian Order of the Red Eagle and the Bavarian Order of Saint Hubert.

Despite the vocal objections of her mother, Charlotte of Mecklenburg-Strelitz, Frederick married Princess Elizabeth of the United Kingdom, the third daughter of King George III, in the Queen's House in the Mall (now integrated into Buckingham Palace) on 7 April 1818. It was no love match: Elizabeth longed to be free from her domineering mother at any cost, while Frederick needed her sizeable dowry to improve the Landgraviate's strained finances. However, by all accounts Frederick treated his bride kindly and affectionately, and the princess reported herself to be quite happy. As Elizabeth was over the age of 48 at the time of their marriage, this union produced no offspring.

Landgrave Frederick V died on 20 January 1820; Frederick succeeded him as monarch of the 221 km^{2} (85 sq mi) principality. The new Landgrave struggled to repay his father's exorbitant debts. Nine years into his reign, the Landgrave died of complications from a pre-existing leg wound. He was succeeded by his brother, Louis William.

== Ancestry ==
Ancestors of Frederick VI of Hesse-Homburg

8. Landgrave Casimir William of Hesse-Homburg
4. Frederick IV, Landgrave of Hesse-Homburg
9. Countess Christine Charlotte of Solms-Braunfels
2. Frederick V
10. Friedrich Wilhelm, Prince of Solms-Braunfels
5. Countess Ulrike Louise of Solms-Braunfels
11. Countess Sophie Magdalena Benigna of Solms-Laubach-Utphe
1. Frederick VI, Landgrave of Hesse-Homburg
12. Louis VIII, Landgrave of Hesse-Darmstadt
6. Louis IX, Landgrave of Hesse-Darmstadt
13. Countess Charlotte of Hanau-Lichtenberg
3. Landgravine Caroline of Hesse-Darmstadt
14. Christian III, Count Palatine of Zweibrücken
7. Countess Palatine Caroline of Zweibrücken
15. Caroline of Nassau-Saarbrücken

== Citations ==
Frederick VI of Hesse-Homburg House of Hesse-Homburg Born: 30 July 1769 Died: 2 April 1829
Regnal titles
Preceded by Frederick V	Landgrave of Hesse-Homburg; 1820–1829	Succeeded by Louis William
