= Longueville, Pas-de-Calais =

Longueville
- Commune
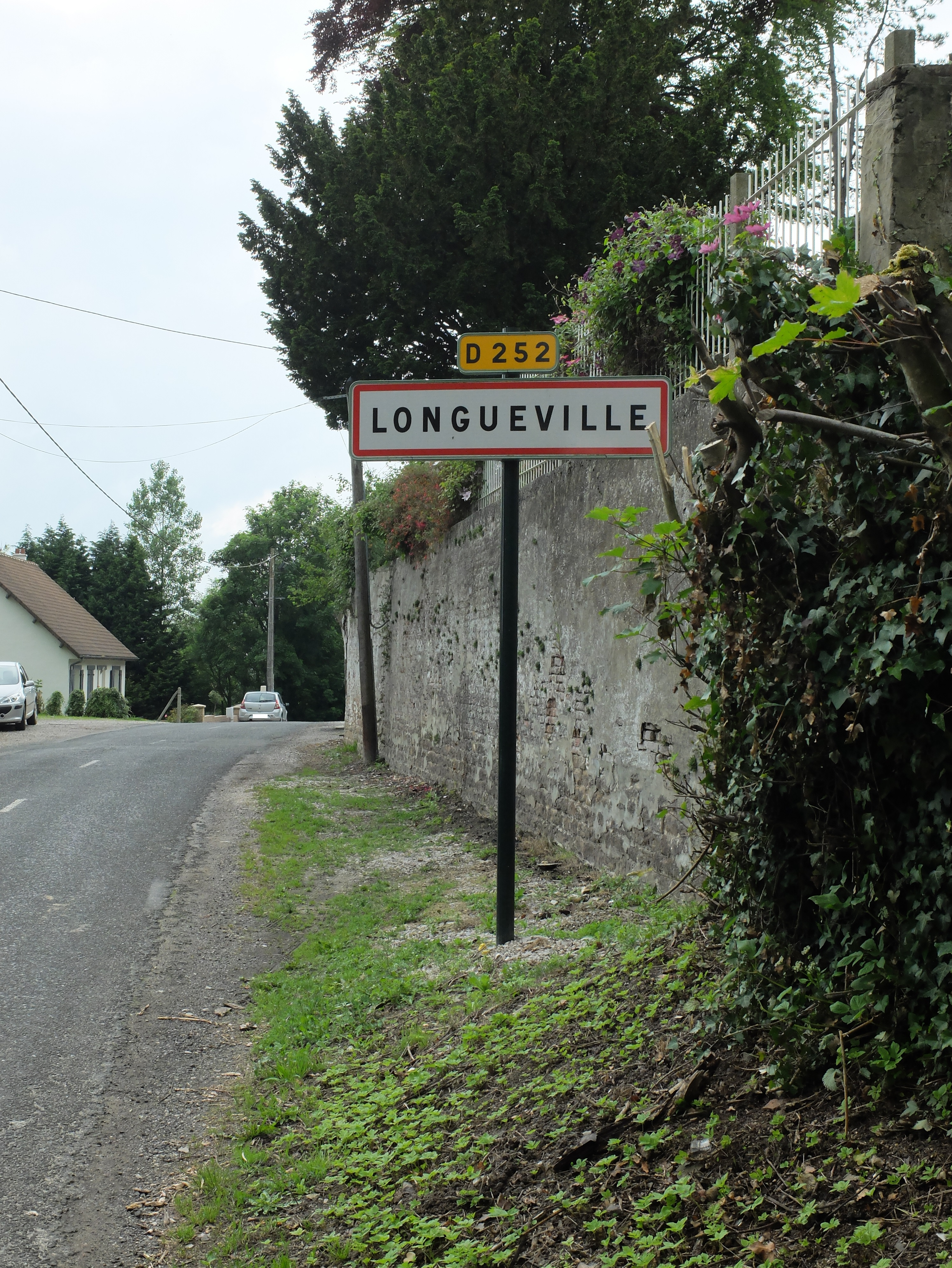
- The road into Longueville

- Coat of arms
- Location of Longueville
- Location within France Location within Hauts-de-France
- Coordinates: 50°43′58″N 1°52′53″E
- Country: France
- Region: Hauts-de-France
- Department: Pas-de-Calais
- Arrondissement: Boulogne-sur-Mer
- Canton: Desvres
- Intercommunality: CC Desvres-Samer

Government
  - Mayor (2020–2026): André Baheux
- Area^{1}: 3.49 km^{2} (1.35 sq mi)
- Elevation: 111 m (364 ft)
- Highest elevation: 200 m (660 ft)
- Lowest elevation: 59 m (194 ft)
- Population (2023): 149
  - Density: 42.7/km^{2} (111/sq mi)
- Time zone: UTC+01:00 (CET)
  - Summer (DST): UTC+02:00 (CEST)
- INSEE/Postal code: 62526 /62142
- ^{1} French Land Register data, which excludes lakes, ponds, glaciers > 1 km^{2} (0.386 sq mi or 247 acres) and river estuaries.

Longueville (French pronunciation: [lɔ̃ɡvil]) is a commune in the Pas-de-Calais department in the Hauts-de-France region of France.

== Geography ==
Longueville is situated some 14 miles (23 km) east of Boulogne, at the junction of the N42 and D252 roads.

== Population ==
Historical population
| Year | Pop. | ±% p.a. |
|---|---|---|
| 1968 | 88 | — |
| 1975 | 102 | +2.13% |
| 1982 | 104 | +0.28% |
| 1990 | 98 | −0.74% |
| 1999 | 117 | +1.99% |
| 2007 | 140 | +2.27% |
| 2012 | 129 | −1.62% |
| 2017 | 138 | +1.36% |
| 2023 | 149 | +1.29% |
Source: INSEE

== Transport ==
The Chemin de fer de Boulogne à Bonningues (CF de BB) opened a station at Longueville on 22 April 1900. Passenger services were withdrawn on 31 December 1935. They were reinstated in November 1942. The CF de BB closed in 1948.

== Places of interest ==
- Church of St. Sylvestre, dating from the fifteenth century.

== See also ==
- Communes of the Pas-de-Calais department
