= Maximilian von Wimpffen =

Austrian general (1770–1854)

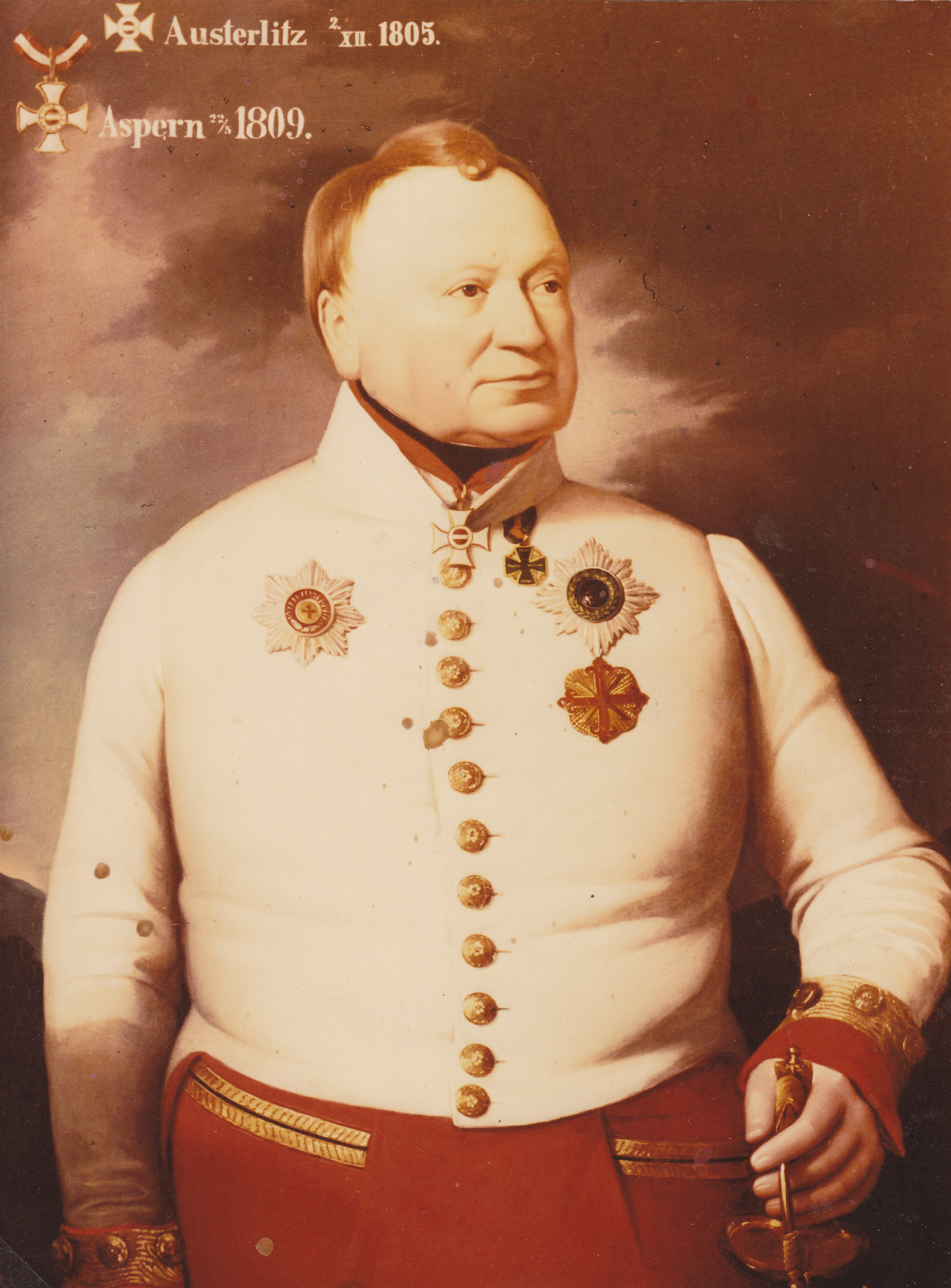
- Field Marshal Maximilian, Graf von Wimpffen.
- Born: 1770; Westphalia
- Died: 1854 (aged 83–84)
- Military career
- Allegiance: Habsburg Monarchy
- Branch: General Staff
- Service years: 1786–1844
- Rank: Field marshal
- Conflicts: French Revolutionary Wars; Napoleonic Wars
- Awards: • Commanders Cross of the Military Order of Maria Theresa
- Other work: General Commandant in the Austrian Army, Chief of the Army Staff

Feldmarschall Maximilian Alexander Graf von Wimpffen (né Freiherr von Wimpffen; 1770–1854) was a military commander who served in the Austrian army during the French Revolutionary Wars and Napoleonic Wars. Although a competent field commander, he was above all noted for his excellent knowledge of military strategy and tactics, which made him a key member in the General Staff of the Imperial and Royal Army during the Napoleonic Wars.

== Early career ==
Born in Westphalia in 1770, Wimpffen was admitted at the Wiener Neustadt Military Academy and graduated in 1786 to join Infanterie Regiment 9 Clerfayt. He was remarked early on for his bravery at the siege of Belgrade, where he led a noted assault of the city, at the head of a column of volunteers. He received a wound during this action but was rewarded by being promoted Oberleutnant in the Morzin Grenadier Battalion. He was then commissioned in Belgium, where he served as Adjutant to Feldmarschallleutnant József Alvinczi and then led his Grenadiers at the battle of Neerwinden, an action during which he was wounded and taken prisoner. Released, he took part in the battle of Landrecy in 1794 and the next year he was transferred to Italy, where he played a role at the battle of Loano in November. In 1796, he joined the General Staff, with the rank of Hauptmann (Captain) but he was never very far from danger and was again wounded while fighting in the streets of Valeggio that June. He was then given commands at the battle of Brenta and battle of Caldiero, before being sent to serve in Heinrich von Bellegarde's staff in the Tyrol. He was instrumental in coordinating the building of defences at Feldkirch, which had a significant role in the Austrian victory against André Masséna in March 1799. Wimpffen was severely wounded during a counterattack against Masséna's forces, but refused to take sick leave and was soon back in action in Italy, receiving a fifth wound at the battle of the Mincio River, while he was serving as Adjutant to commander-in-chief Heinrich von Bellegarde.

After the end of the War of the Second Coalition, Wimpffen was given a position as Adjutant in the newly created Inner Austrian military command (1803) and was promoted to Oberst (Colonel) in 1805.

== Napoleonic Wars and beyond ==
With the outbreak of the Napoleonic Wars, Wimpffen only took part to the late stages of the War of the Third Coalition, when he was appointed as staff officer in Moritz Lichtenstein's command and was among those who advised the Army Chief of Staff, Franz von Weyrother, against an immediate battle. His advice was ignored and the Coalition was decisively defeated by Napoleon I at the battle of Austerlitz on 2 December 1805. During this battle, he was badly wounded, while directing troops during the main Coalition attack, but his merits were appreciated and was awarded the Military Order of Maria Theresa and the position of General-Adjutant to Archduke Charles of Austria-Teschen (1806).

Wimpffen was still holding this position at the outbreak of the War of the Fifth Coalition in 1809 and thus commanded the Adjutant department during the first stages of this war. Then, on 26 April 1809, he was named Chief of Staff of the Army and was promoted to the rank of General Major. As Chief of Staff, Wimpffen was instrumental in planning and coordinating the actions of the army at the battle of Aspern-Essling, but, despite his best efforts, could not prevent the decisive Austrian defeat at the battle of Wagram. For his services during this campaign, he was awarded the Commander Cross of the Order of Maria Theresa and then given a field command in Transylvania. The next major stage of his career came in 1813, after Austria joined the War of the Sixth Coalition and Wimpffen was promoted to Feldmarschallleutnant and given the command of a division, which he led at the battle of Leipzig. He was then detailed to take part in the invasion of France and helped take the city of Lyon, after the defeat of the French under Marshal Pierre Augereau. After the end of the Napoleonic Wars, Wimpffen was given several positions of General-Commandant and then, in 1824, the position of Chief of the Army Staff. He was also promoted to the top military rank of Field Marshal.

Described as a fearless and pugnacious soldier, wounded in battle eight times, Wimpffen was above all noted for his knowledge of military strategy and tactics, able battle dispositions and sanguine attitude in front of danger, which made him a key element of the Austrian General Staff during much of the Napoleonic Wars.

== Sources ==
- Hollins, David - "Austrian commanders of the Napoleonic Wars 1792-1815", Osprey Publishing, Elite 101. 2004. ISBN 1-84176-664-X
