= Ignaz Count Hardegg =

Austrian general and politician (1772–1848)

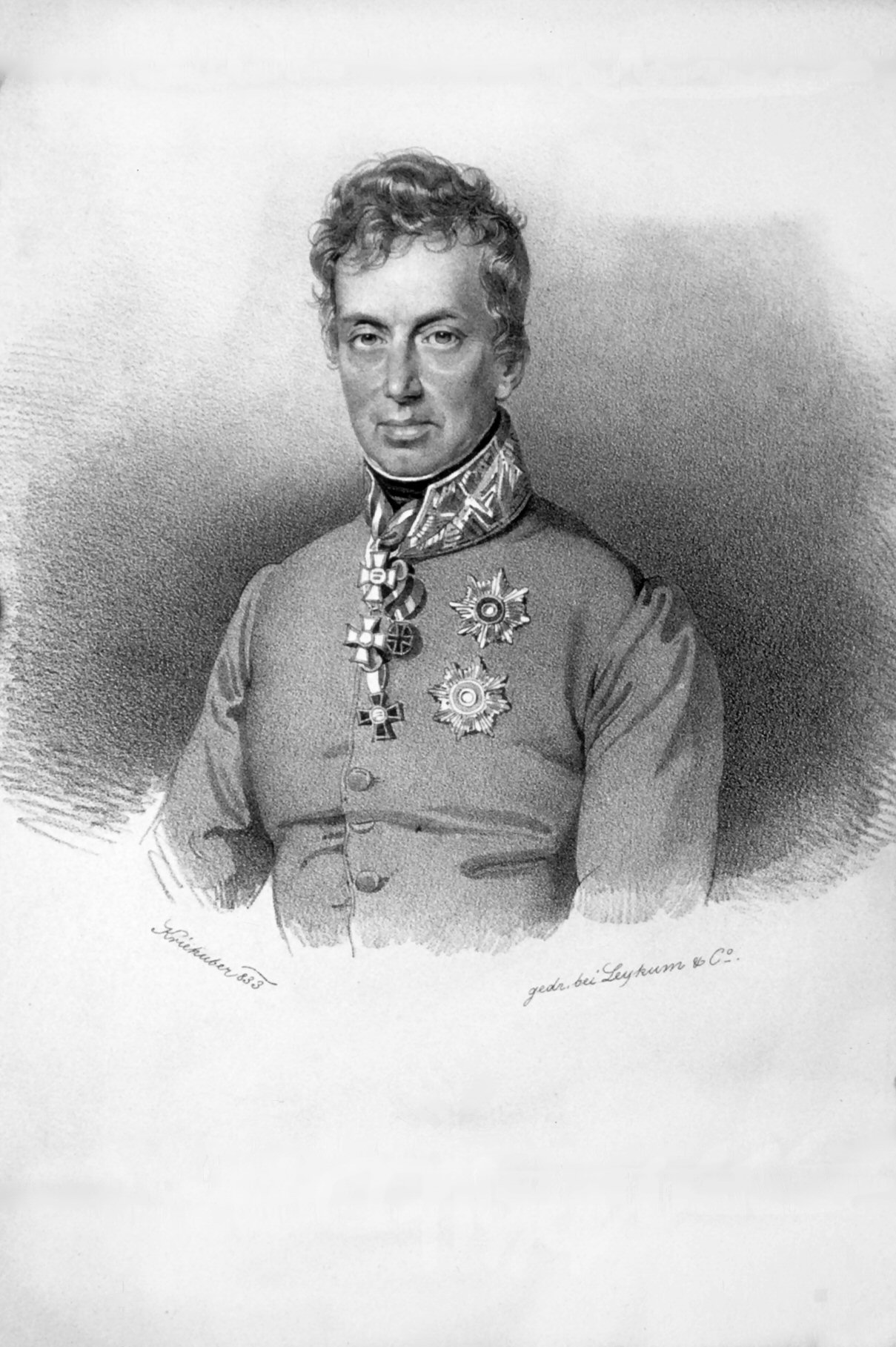
Portrait of Ignaz Graf Hardegg in 1833 by Josef Kriehuber.

Ignaz Franz Graf zu Hardegg auf Glatz und im Marchlande (Vienna, 30 July 1772 – Vienna, 17 February 1848) was an Austrian General of the cavalry. He was an important commander during the Napoleonic Wars and from 1831 to 1848 President of the Hofkriegsrat.

== Biography ==
Ignaz Graf zu Hardegg came from the ancient Lower Austrian noble Hardegg family. His two younger brothers Johann Anton (1773–1825) and Johann Heinrich (1778–1854) also reached high positions in the Austrian military.

He had his first war experiences at the age of 16, under Laudon in the Austro-Turkish War (1788–1791). Promoted to Rittmeister in 1792, he took part in the Battle of Jemappes during the First Coalition War in the same year. In 1795 he fought with distinction in the Battle of Handschuchsheim and received the Military Order of Maria Theresa for his services.

In 1796 he served in Germany and in 1800 was able to repulse an attack from Breisach. For this act he was commended by Archduke Karl in the general staff and promoted to major. Hardegg, who had now been promoted to colonel and commander of the Schwarzenberg regiment, was unable to participate in the Campaign of 1805 due to illness.

During the War of the Fifth Coalition in 1809 as major general, he again excelled in the Battle of Aspern-Essling. In the following Battle of Wagram he defended his position near Baumersdorf with great perseverance and received the Grand Cross of the Military Order of Maria Theresa for his bravery. In 1813 he took part in the campaign in Bohemia and the Battle of Dresden and was promoted to Lieutenant Field Marshal in the same year. In the Battle of Leipzig he led the vanguard of the left wing, but received a serious head injury at Dölitz. Recovered, he was able to take part in the fighting in France in 1814. He stormed the city of Moret-sur-Loing, stubbornly defended by General Montbrun, and later fought with the southern army against Marshal Augereau.

=== After the War ===
Hardegg took part in the Congress of Vienna in 1815, where he was added to the Russian Tsar Alexander I, a position that he later retained at the congresses in Troppau, Verona and Laibach.

In 1829 Hardegg was appointed military commander of Linz and a year later he was appointed commander of Transylvania. In 1831, as General of the Cavalry, he became President of the Hofkriegsrat, an office that he held until his death.

On 28 October 1841 he was awarded the Order of the Black Eagle, the highest distinction of the Kingdom of Prussia.
In 1836 he was accepted into the Austrian Order of the Golden Fleece.

Ignaz Graf zu Hardegg died on 17 February 1848, at the age of 75 in Vienna.

== Sources ==
- Wilhelm Edler von Janko (1879). "Ignaz zu Hardegg". Allgemeine Deutsche Biographie (in German). Vol. 10. Leipzig: Duncker & Humblot. pp. 556–557.
- BLKÖ

Military offices
Preceded by Johann Maria Philipp Frimont	President of the Hofkriegsrat; 1831–1848	Succeeded by Karl Ludwig von Ficquelmont
