= Gustav, Landgrave of Hesse-Homburg =

Landgrave of Hesse-Homburg

Gustav
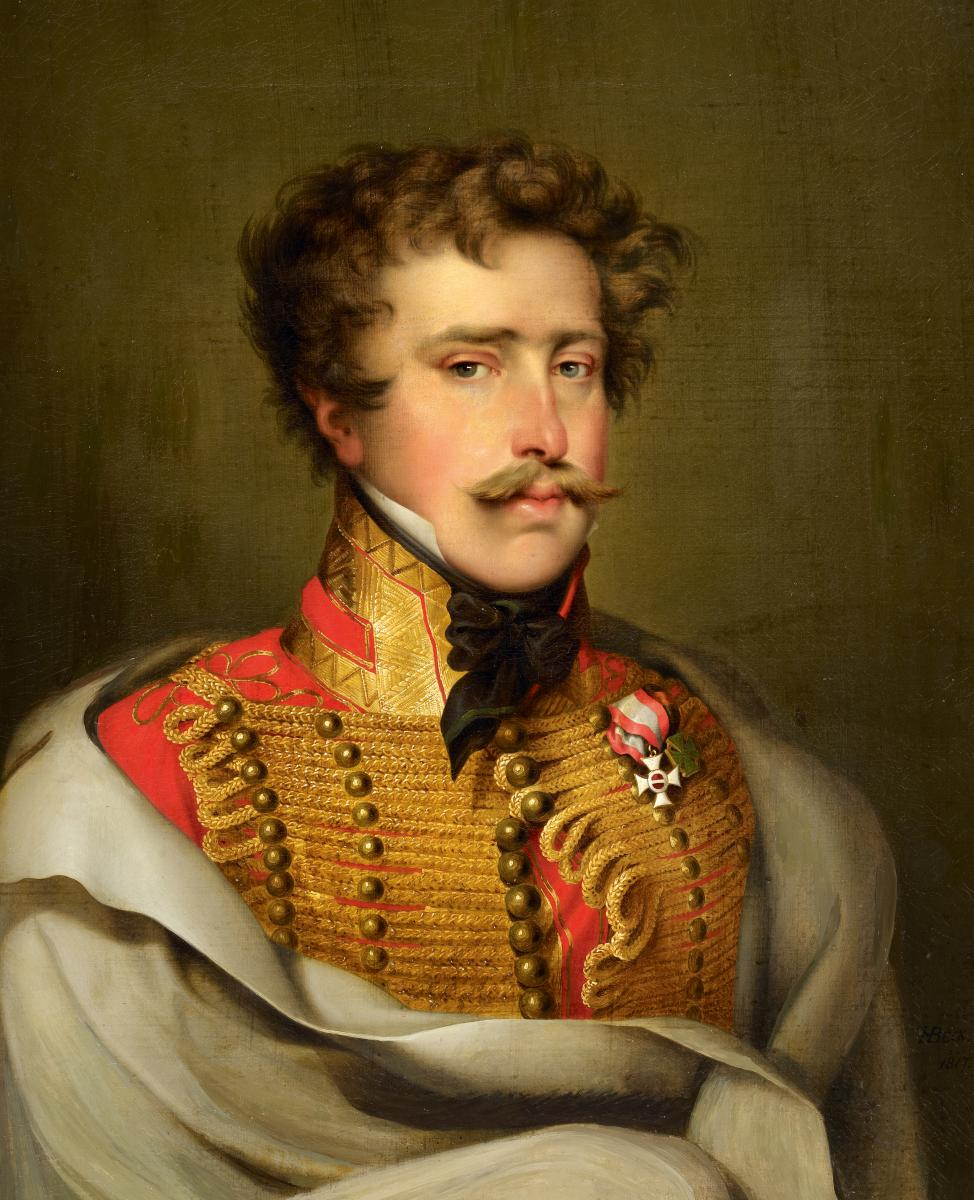

Landgrave of Hesse-Homburg
- Reign: 15 December 1846 – 8 September 1848
- Predecessor: Philip
- Successor: Ferdinand
- Born: 17 February 1781
- Died: 8 September 1848 (aged 67)
- Spouse: Princess Louise of Anhalt-Dessau (m. 1818)
- Issue: Caroline, Princess Reuss of Greiz; Princess Elisabeth; Prince Frederick
Names
- German: Gustav Adolph Friedrich
- House: Hesse
- Father: Frederick V, Landgrave of Hesse-Homburg
- Mother: Landgravine Caroline of Hesse-Darmstadt

Gustav, Landgrave of Hesse-Homburg (17 February 1781 – 8 September 1848) was landgrave of the German state of Hesse-Homburg from 1846 to 1848.

== Early life ==
On 17 February 1781, Gustav was born the fourth son of Frederick V, Landgrave of Hesse-Homburg and his wife, Landgravine Caroline of Hesse-Darmstadt. Gustav joined the Swedish army in service of his godfather King Gustav III, but left soon after in favour of an Austrian regiment. The prince saw action in the early 19th-century battles of Nördlingen, Hohenlinden, Ratisbon, Aspern-Essling, Wagram, Dresden, and Leipzig. His sister-in-law, Princess Elizabeth of the United Kingdom, later wrote that Gustav "gained as much fame and glory on the battlefield as any of his brothers."

In 1818, Gustav married his niece Princess Louise of Anhalt-Dessau, the same year Elizabeth married his eldest brother Frederick. Gustav and Louise lived at Homburg Castle, and had three children: Caroline, Elizabeth, and Frederick. The youngest, Frederick, contracted scarlet fever when he was two years old but recovered. Gustav, Louise, and their children kept to themselves and did little socializing with their sister-in-law, Elizabeth, to her dismay. Their eldest child Caroline married Henry XX, Prince Reuss of Greiz, in 1839.

== Reign ==
In 1846, Gustav inherited rule of Hesse-Homburg from his brother, Philip. In reaction to a petition put forth by his people, in 1848 Gustav emancipated Homburg's Jews, decreeing that "in local and state affairs no difference shall henceforth be made between our Christian and our Jewish subjects." That same year, Hesse-Homburg was one of nine German states that allowed Jews to be elected to Parliament for the first time.

Due to an illness, his only son predeceased him; as a result, when Gustav died on 8 September 1848, he was succeeded by his brother Ferdinand. In 1851, a monument was built in Gustav's honor in Homburg.

== Issue ==
- Princess Caroline (1819–1872); married in 1839 to Henry XX, Prince Reuss of Greiz (1794–1859)
- Princess Elisabeth (1823–1864)
- Prince Frederick (1830–1848)

== Ancestry ==
Ancestors of Gustav, Landgrave of Hesse-Homburg

8. Landgrave Casimir William of Hesse-Homburg
4. Frederick IV, Landgrave of Hesse-Homburg
9. Countess Christine Charlotte of Solms-Braunfels
2. Frederick V
10. Friedrich Wilhelm, Prince of Solms-Braunfels
5. Countess Ulrike Louise of Solms-Braunfels
11. Countess Sophie Magdalena Benigna of Solms-Laubach-Utphe
1. Gustav, Landgrave of Hesse-Homburg
12. Louis VIII, Landgrave of Hesse-Darmstadt
6. Louis IX, Landgrave of Hesse-Darmstadt
13. Countess Charlotte of Hanau-Lichtenberg
3. Landgravine Caroline of Hesse-Darmstadt
14. Christian III, Count Palatine of Zweibrücken
7. Countess Palatine Caroline of Zweibrücken
15. Caroline of Nassau-Saarbrücken

Gustav, Landgrave of Hesse-Homburg House of Hesse Born: 17 February 1781 Died: 8 September 1848
Preceded by Philip	Landgrave of Hesse-Homburg; 1846–1848	Succeeded by Ferdinand
