= Frederick V of Hesse-Homburg =

Frederick V
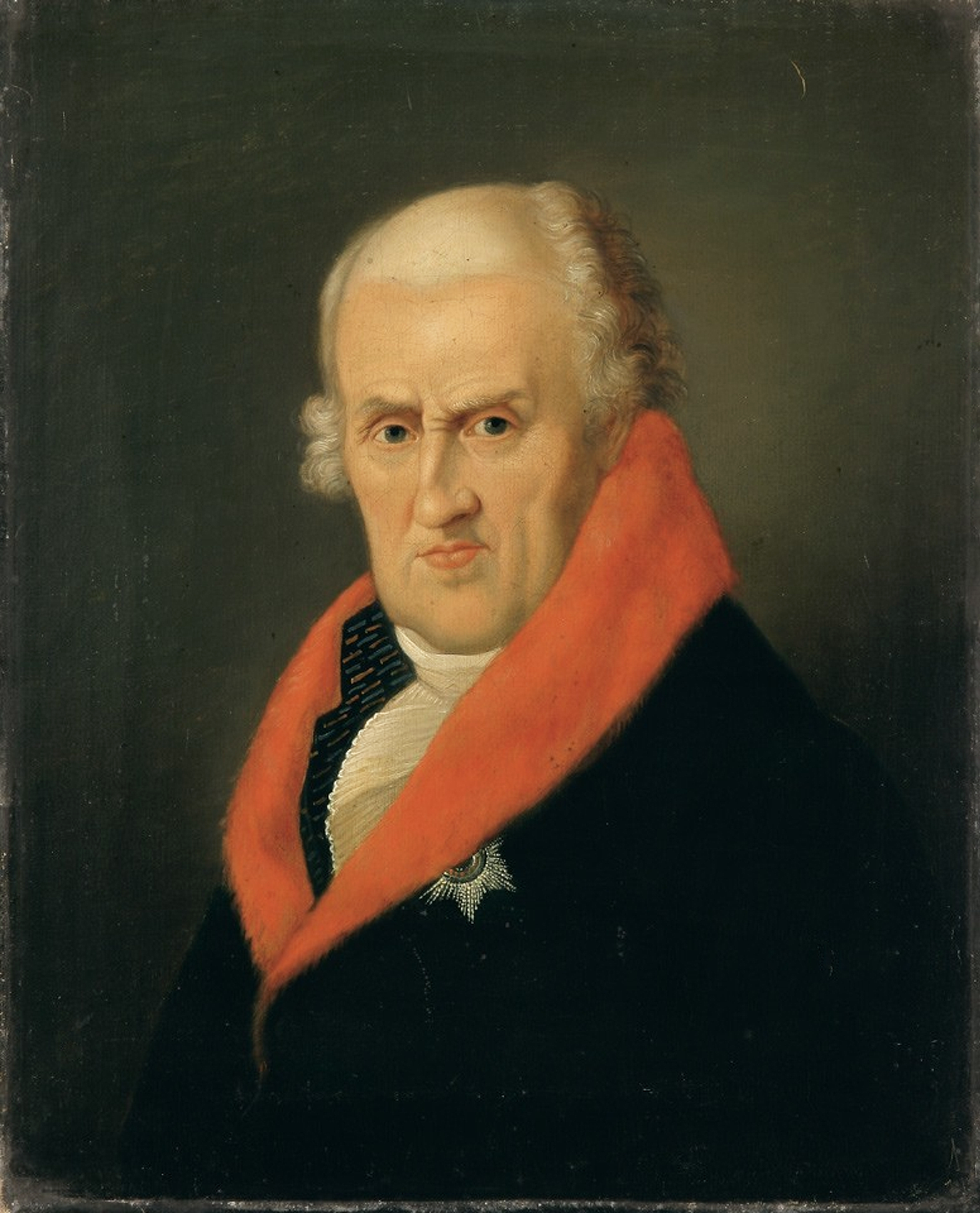
- Frederick V, c. 1815

Landgrave of Hesse-Homburg
- Reign: 7 February 1751 – 20 January 1820
- Predecessor: Frederick IV
- Successor: Frederick VI
- Born: 30 January 1748; Bad Homburg vor der Höhe
- Died: 20 January 1820 (aged 71); Bad Homburg vor der Höhe
- Spouse: Princess Caroline of Hesse-Darmstadt (m. 1768)
- Issue: Frederick VI, Landgrave of Hesse-Homburg; Louis William, Landgrave of Hesse-Homburg; Caroline, Princess of Schwarzburg-Rudolstadt; Louise, Princess Charles Günther of Schwarzburg-Rudolstadt; Amalie, Hereditary Princess of Anhalt-Dessau; Auguste, Hereditary Grand Duchess of Mecklenburg-Schwerin; Philip, Landgrave of Hesse-Homburg; Gustav, Landgrave of Hesse-Homburg; Ferdinand, Landgrave of Hesse-Homburg; Maria Anna, Princess William of Prussia; Prince Leopold
- House: Hesse
- Father: Frederick IV, Landgrave of Hesse-Homburg
- Mother: Ulrike Louise of Solms-Braunfels

Frederick V Louis William Christian, Landgrave of Hesse-Homburg (30 January 1748, Bad Homburg vor der Höhe – 20 January 1820, Bad Homburg vor der Höhe) was from 1751 to his death landgrave of Hesse-Homburg.

He was born under Europe's Ancien Regime but lived to see the Age of Enlightenment, the French Revolution, the fall of the Holy Roman Empire, the rise and fall of Napoleon I, the Congress of Vienna and its establishment of a new geopolitical order in Europe and Germany. Unlike his predecessors and successors, he was not keen on war and instead became one of the patrons of German Geistesgeschichte, corresponding with Lavater and Klopstock and visiting Voltaire, D’Alembert and Albrecht von Haller. He was caustic, conservative but popular with his people.

== Life ==
=== Regency and accession ===
He was born in 1748, the only son of Frederick IV, Landgrave of Hesse-Homburg and Princess Ulrike Louise of Solms-Braunfels (1731–1792), daughter of Frederick William, Prince of Solms-Braunfels. His father died when he was only three and he succeeded to the landgraviate - Francis I, Holy Roman Emperor allowed his mother to become his regent, despite opposition from Louis VIII, Landgrave of Hesse-Darmstadt, who had occupied Hesse-Homburg in 1747. Councillor Friedrich Karl Kasimir von Creutz fought on Frederick's behalf and was even imprisoned for 18 months, leading to the case being tried before the Reichshofrat and Francis himself. Finally in 1756 Louis was ordered out of Hesse-Homburg.

On 22 March 1766 he reached majority early thanks to von Creutz's efforts and began ruling the landgraviate. He ended the dispute with Hesse-Darmstadt via a treaty in which Hesse-Darmstadt renounced all claims to Hesse-Homburg but still represented it on the Reichstag and Kreistag rather than Hesse-Homburg directly representing itself. This new status quo was cemented on 27 September 1768 by Frederick's dynastic and diplomatic marriage to Caroline of Hesse-Darmstadt, the Francophile daughter of Louis IX, Landgrave of Hesse-Darmstadt and Countess Palatine Caroline of Zweibrücken. It was not a love match - in his old age he wrote in his memoirs that he was yet to know love, as is also evidenced by his long absences and by remarks in letters written about him by noble families in the landgraviate.

=== Education ===
During his minority Frederick had been educated by his pious Calvinist, Pietist and humanist tutor Alexander von Sinclair (father of the future diplomat Isaac von Sinclair). He was criticised for over-educating Frederick but answered "Is he called to be a huntsman or one of the high-born wastrels with whom Germany is teeming? Should he spend his time gaming, hunting and walking or will he instead need to read the reports and expert opinions of his councillors and make decisions about them?" Sinclair's strict education can be almost wholly reconstructed, using court records and reports to his mother, who showed no interest in her son's education. It formed the foundation for his later convictions that piety and self-knowledge were the routes to salvation.

Frederick stammered, impeding his education in public speaking, but Sinclair taught him philosophy, maths, architecture, chess and pianoforte. A military career was out of the question, however, since Frederick was too dynastically valuable to risk his life. In line with Sinclair's Calvinist-Pietist ideals, Frederick managed the state finances as honestly as he could, though he often had to ask for loans from bankers in Amsterdam or Frankfurt. He did not manage to correct the major financial mismanagement he had inherited, despite efforts by specialists such as Friedrich Karl von Moser. Even as late as 1780 his administration was unable to draw up a list of all debts, receipts and expenditure and Frederick's intent to put all decrees in writing seemed impossible - the mismanagement was handed on to Frederick's successor.

=== Arts and Freemasonry ===
Scholars, poets and musicians were always welcome at Frederick's court. Johann Wolfgang von Goethe stayed there, falling in love there and mentioning the White Tower in his "Pilgrim's Morning Song". Two of Frederick's main concerns were his library and the state's school system - he even continued to buy books when he was behind on salary payments to court officials. Caroline enjoyed French works, but Frederick preferred non-fiction, collecting works on philosophy, history, military science and theology. A passionate traveler and travel writer, he also collected other people's travel writings. Brauer writes that he "generally liked to write philosophical-political-religious treatises. It seemed to him that the best enlightenment that could be taught in schools was that Christianity was God's will divinely revealed and that life in heaven was the ultimate aim of life on earth - he also felt it best to limit the number of literate people, secondary schools and universities". Despite his piety, he was a strong backer of the Société Patriotique de Hesse-Hombourg, a short-lived project to centre for coordinating Enlightenment ideas from across the whole of Europe, granting it financial support.

On 27 August 1782 he was admitted as a freemason by Prince Charles of Hesse-Kassel just outside the Wilhelmsbader Konvent in the presence of Frederick II, Landgrave of Hesse-Kassel and Prince Christian of Hesse-Darmstadt. He is said to have failed to keep his promise to seek out a lodge, he reached the fifth grade (Ecuyer) of the Rectified Scottish Rite. This informed his encounters with Goethe and Klopstock, who were also Freemasons. The foundation of the "Friedrich zum Nordstern" lodge in Homburg in 1817 would have been inconceivable without his protection and attention - it outlived him, lasting until it was shut down by his anti-Masonic successor Frederick VI.

In 1802 Alexander von Sinclair's son Isaac asked Frederick for a permanent position as court librarian for his old friend Friedrich Hölderlin, who had fallen into melancholy after professional setbacks and the death of his mistress. Frederick had known Hölderlin since 1798 and Frederick agreed, on condition that Sinclair pay Hölderlin's salary himself. Hölderlin took up the post in June 1804 but since Frederick himself assisted in the library, he had little to do. He dedicated his poem Patmos to Frederick, which may also have been a commission from Sinclair - Frederick had initially hope that Klopstock would write him such a hymn.

=== Occupation and restoration ===
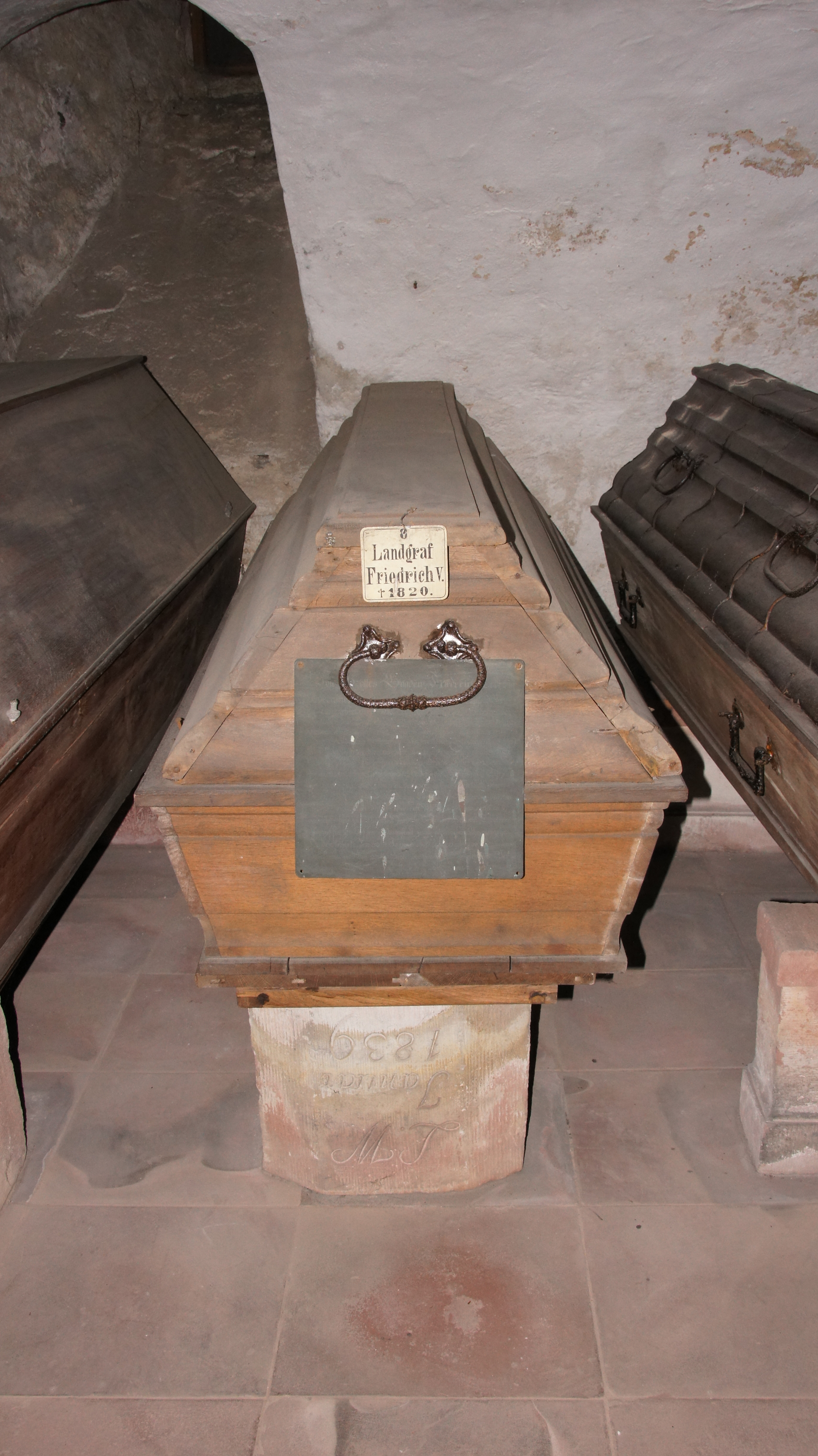
Sarcophagus of Frederick V in the landgraviate's vault.

He once nicknamed himself "Frederick the Hermit" but even he could not wholly ignore the outside world, especially when in 1795 a French Revolutionary army under Jean-Baptiste Jourdan broke through into the Rhein-Main-Gebiet. From then on Homburg was under almost constant military occupation and the state had to pay contributions to France. Generals Laurent de Gouvion Saint-Cyr and Michel Ney even moved their headquarters into Bad Homburg Castle in 1798, ejecting Frederick and his family to private lodgings in then-neutral Prussia (his six adult sons were already on military service). When Francis II dissolved the Holy Roman Empire, Frederick refused to join the Confederation of the Rhine and so in 1806 Hesse-Homburg was annexed to Hesse-Darmstadt as part of the German mediatization, despite Frederick's pleas to Napoleon himself. Its administration was relocated to Gießen and Frederick retreated to landscaping his "Tempe" gardens at the foot of the Taunus, seeking a cure in the Schlangenbad baths and staying in a suite of rooms at the 'Stadt Ulm' hotel in Frankfurt am Main.

After the fall of Napoleon, Hesse-Homburg was one of a few mediatised states which regained their former status, even winning total independence from Hesse-Darmstadt for the first time. This was thanks to his youngest daughter Marianne (who had married into the Prussian royal family in 1810), his six sons' military service with Prussia and his (albeit minor) family connection to the House of Hesse. This was confirmed via the German Confederation Constitution of 1815, which gave Frederick back his original lands and even added the 176 km² Grand Bailiwick of Meisenheim on the west bank of the Rhine, taken from the French department of Sarre. He had hoped for better (including an increase to neighbouring Rosbach vor der Höhe and Oberusel) and complained "What should I do with this district in China?". However, Hesse-Homburg was now a sovereign state again, joining the German Confederation as its smallest state on 7 July 1817. In 1818 his eldest son married into the British royal family by his union with George III's daughter Elizabeth. In 1819 Frederick established the Schwerterkreuz medal for military service in Hesse-Homburg's armies (now rare as it was only awarded sixteen times) and the following year he died in the castle at Bad Homburg.

== Issue ==
He and Caroline had 15 children, of whom the following 11 survived to adulthood:

- Frederick VI, Landgrave of Hesse-Homburg (1769–1829); married in 1818 Princess Elizabeth of the United Kingdom (1770–1840), a daughter of King George III of the United Kingdom.
- Louis William, Landgrave of Hesse-Homburg (1770–1839); married in 1804 Princess Augusta of Nassau-Usingen (1778–1846), divorced 1805.
- Landgravine Ulrike Louise Karoline of Hesse-Homburg (1771–1854); married in 1791 Louis Frederick II, Prince of Schwarzburg-Rudolstadt (1767–1807).
- Landgravine Louise Ulrike of Hesse-Homburg (1772–1854); married in 1793 Prince Charles Günther of Schwarzburg-Rudolstadt (1771–1825).
- Landgravine Amalie of Hesse-Homburg (1774–1846); married in 1792 Frederick, Hereditary Prince of Anhalt-Dessau (1769–1814).
- Landgravine Auguste of Hesse-Homburg (1776–1871); married in 1818 Frederick Louis, Hereditary Grand Duke of Mecklenburg-Schwerin (1778–1819).
- Philip, Landgrave of Hesse-Homburg (1779–1846); married (morganatically) in 1838 Rosalie Antonie, Baroness Schimmelpfennig von der Oye, née Pototschnig (1806–1845), "Countess of Naumburg".
- Gustav, Landgrave of Hesse-Homburg (1781–1848); married in 1818 his niece Princess Louise of Anhalt-Dessau (1798–1858).
- Ferdinand, Landgrave of Hesse-Homburg (1783–1866)
- Landgravine Marie Anna of Hesse-Homburg (1785–1846); married in 1804 Prince Friedrich Wilhelm Karl of Prussia (1783–1851)
- Landgrave Leopold of Hesse-Homburg (1787–1813); killed at the Battle of Großgörschen.

== Ancestry ==
Ancestors of Frederick V of Hesse-Homburg

8. Frederick II, Landgrave of Hesse-Homburg
4. Landgrave Casimir William of Hesse-Homburg
9. Luise Elisabeth von Kurland
2. Frederick IV, Landgrave of Hesse-Homburg
10. Wilhelm Moritz, Count of Solms-Braunfels
5. Countess Christine Charlotte of Solms-Braunfels
11. Madeleine Sophie of Hesse-Homburg
1. Frederick V, Landgrave of Hesse-Homburg
12. Wilhelm Moritz, Count of Solms-Braunfels (=10)
6. Frederick William, Prince of Solms-Braunfels
13. Madeleine Sophie of Hesse-Homburg (=11)
3. Ulrike Louise of Solms-Braunfels
14. Karl Otto, Count of Solms-Laubach-Utphe and Tecklenburg
7. Countess Sophia Magdalena Benigna of Solms-Laubach-Utphe
15. Countess Louise of Schönburg-Waldenburg

Frederick V of Hesse-Homburg House of Hesse Born: 30 January 1748 Died: 20 January 1820
Preceded by Frederick IV	Landgrave of Hesse-Homburg; 1751–1820	Succeeded by Frederick VI
