= Princess Caroline of Hesse-Darmstadt =

Landgravine of Hesse-Homburg from 1768 to 1820

Caroline of Hesse-Darmstadt
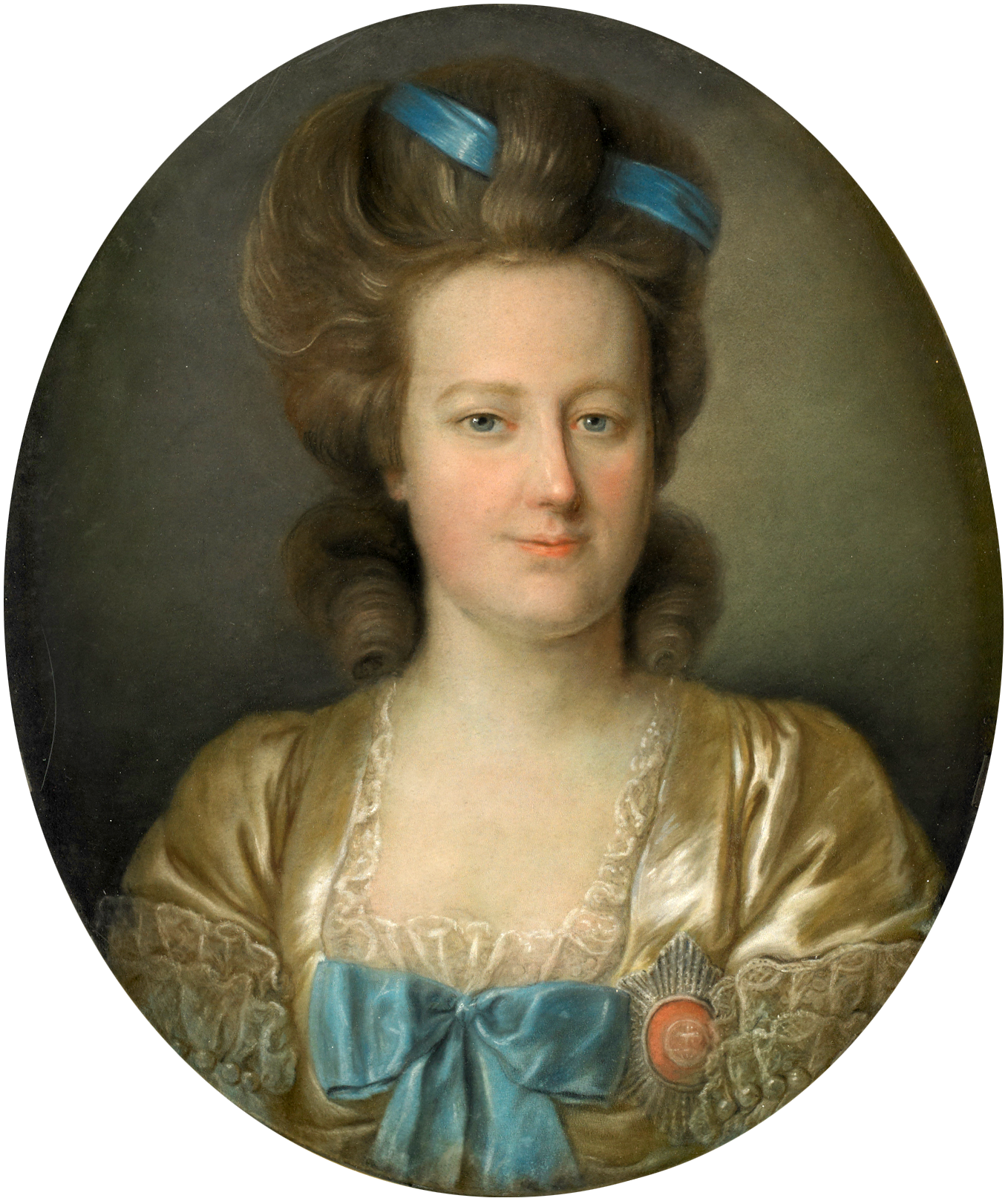

Landgravine consort of Hesse-Homburg
- Tenure: 27 September 1768 – 20 January 1820
- Born: 2 March 1746; Buchsweiler
- Died: 18 September 1821 (aged 75); Bad Homburg vor der Höhe
- Spouse: Frederick V, Landgrave of Hesse-Homburg (m. 1768; died 1820)
- Issue: Frederick VI, Landgrave of Hesse-Homburg; Louis William, Landgrave of Hesse-Homburg; Caroline, Princess of Schwarzburg-Rudolstadt; Louise, Princess Charles Günther of Schwarzburg-Rudolstadt; Amalie, Hereditary Princess of Anhalt-Dessau; Auguste, Hereditary Grand Duchess of Mecklenburg-Schwerin; Philip, Landgrave of Hesse-Homburg; Gustav, Landgrave of Hesse-Homburg; Ferdinand, Landgrave of Hesse-Homburg; Maria Anna, Princess of Prussia; Prince Leopold
- House: Hesse
- Father: Louis IX, Landgrave of Hesse-Darmstadt
- Mother: Countess Palatine Caroline of Zweibrücken

Caroline of Hesse-Darmstadt (2 March 1746 – 18 September 1821) was Landgravine consort of Hesse-Homburg by marriage to Frederick V, Landgrave of Hesse-Homburg.

== Early life ==
Caroline was born on 2 March 1746 in Buchsweiler. She was the eldest daughter of Louis IX, Landgrave of Hesse-Darmstadt and his wife Countess Palatine Caroline of Zweibrücken-Birkenfeld.

== Marriage ==
She married Frederick V, Landgrave of Hesse-Homburg on 27 September 1768. The marriage was contracted for diplomatic and political reasons as the symbol of an inheritance dispute between their respective families. Caroline and Frederick V produced many children but their marriage never developed into a personal relationship, and they lived mostly separated lives. Caroline often spent time in her villa in the forest near Homburg.

== Issue ==
- Frederick VI, Landgrave of Hesse-Homburg (1769–1829), married Princess Elizabeth of the United Kingdom (1770–1840)
- Louis William (1770–1839), married Princess Augusta of Nassau-Usingen (1778–1846), divorced in 1805
- Caroline (1771–1854), married Prince Louis Frederick II, Prince of Schwarzburg-Rudolstadt (1767–1807)
- Louise Ulrike (1772–1854), married Prince Charles Günther of Schwarzburg-Rudolstadt (1771–1825)
- Amalie (1774–1846), married Frederick, Hereditary Prince of Anhalt-Dessau (1769–1814)
- Auguste (1776–1871), married Frederick Louis, Hereditary Grand Duke of Mecklenburg-Schwerin (1778–1819)
- Philip (1779–1846), married Rosalie Antonie, Countess of Naumburg, Baroness Schimmelpenninck von der Oye, née Pototschnig (1806–1845)
- Gustav (1781–1848), married Princess Louise of Anhalt-Dessau (1798–1858)
- Ferdinand (1783–1866), the last Landgrave of Hesse-Homburg
- Maria Anna (1785–1846) married Prince Wilhelm of Prussia (1783–1851)
- Leopold (1787–1813), fell in the Battle of Großgörschen

== Ancestry ==
Ancestors of Princess Caroline of Hesse-Darmstadt

8. Ernest Louis, Landgrave of Hesse-Darmstadt
4. Louis VIII, Landgrave of Hesse-Darmstadt
9. Dorothea Charlotte of Brandenburg-Ansbach
2. Louis IX, Landgrave of Hesse-Darmstadt
10. Johann Reinhard III of Hanau-Lichtenberg
5. Countess Charlotte of Hanau-Lichtenberg
11. Dorothea Friederike of Brandenburg-Ansbach
1. Caroline of Hesse-Darmstadt
12. Christian II of Zweibrücken-Birkenfeld
6. Christian III, Count Palatine of Zweibrücken
13. Katharina Agathe of Rappoltstein
3. Countess Palatine Caroline of Zweibrücken
14. Louis Crato, Count of Nassau-Saarbrücken
7. Caroline of Nassau-Saarbrücken
15. Philippine Henriette of Hohenlohe-Langenburg

German royalty
Vacant Title last held by Ulrike Louise of Solms-Braunfels	Landgravine consort of Hesse-Homburg; 27 September 1768 – 20 January 1820	Succeeded by Elizabeth of the United Kingdom
