= Heinrich XIX, Prince Reuss of Greiz =

Heinrich XIX
- Prince Reuss of Greiz
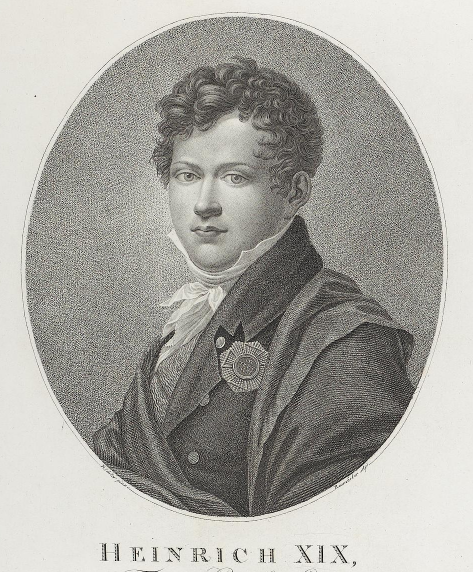
- Reign: 29 January 1817 – 31 October 1836
- Born: 1 March 1790; Offenbach, Grand Duchy of Hesse
- Died: 31 October 1836 (aged 46); Greiz, Reuss Elder Line
- Spouse: Princess Gasparine of Rohan-Rochefort
- Issue Detail: Louise Caroline, Princess Reuss of Köstritz; Elisabeth, Princess of Fürstenberg
- House: House Reuss of Greiz
- Father: Heinrich XIII, Prince Reuss of Greiz
- Mother: Princess Wilhelmine Louise of Nassau-Weilburg

Heinrich XIX, Prince Reuss of Greiz (German: Heinrich XIX Fürst Reuß zu Greiz; 1 March 1790 – 31 October 1836) was Prince Reuss of Greiz from 1817 to 1836.

== Early life ==
Heinrich XIX was born at Offenbach, Grand Duchy of Hesse, elder surviving son of Heinrich XIII, Prince Reuss of Greiz (1747–1817), (son of Heinrich XI, Prince Reuss of Greiz and Countess Conradine Reuss of Köstritz) and his wife, Princess Wilhelmine Louise of Nassau-Weilburg (1765–1837), (daughter of Charles Christian, Prince of Nassau-Weilburg and Princess Carolina of Orange-Nassau). (Note: All sons of a Prince Reuss were named Heinrich; the gap between Heinrich XIII and Heinrich XIX consists of uncles and a brother who pre-deceased Heinrich XIX))

== Prince Reuss of Greiz ==
At the death of his father on 29 January 1817, he succeeded as the Prince Reuss of Greiz.

In 1819 he restored the Unteres Schloss (Lower Castle), where his father had already transferred the family residence.

== Marriage ==
Heinrich XIX married on 7 January 1822 in Prague to Princess Gasparine of Rohan-Rochefort, third daughter of Charles Louis Gaspard of Rohan-Rochefort, and his wife, Marie Louise Joséphine of Rohan-Guéméné.

They had two daughters:

- Princess Louise Caroline Reuss of Greiz (3 December 1822 – 28 May 1875), married firstly in 1842 to Prince Eduard of Saxe-Altenburg, but died in 1852, had issue (namely Prince Albert of Saxe-Altenburg and Princess Marie Gasparine of Saxe-Altenburg); Married secondly in 1854 to Prince Heinrich IV Reuss of Köstritz, had issue, including Heinrich XXIV, Prince Reuss of Köstritz and Eleonore, Tsaritsa of Bulgaria.
- Princess Elisabeth Reuss of Greiz (23 March 1824 – 7 May 1861), married in 1844 to Charles Egon III, Prince of Fürstenberg, had issue (including Charles Egon IV, Prince of Fürstenberg).

== Death ==
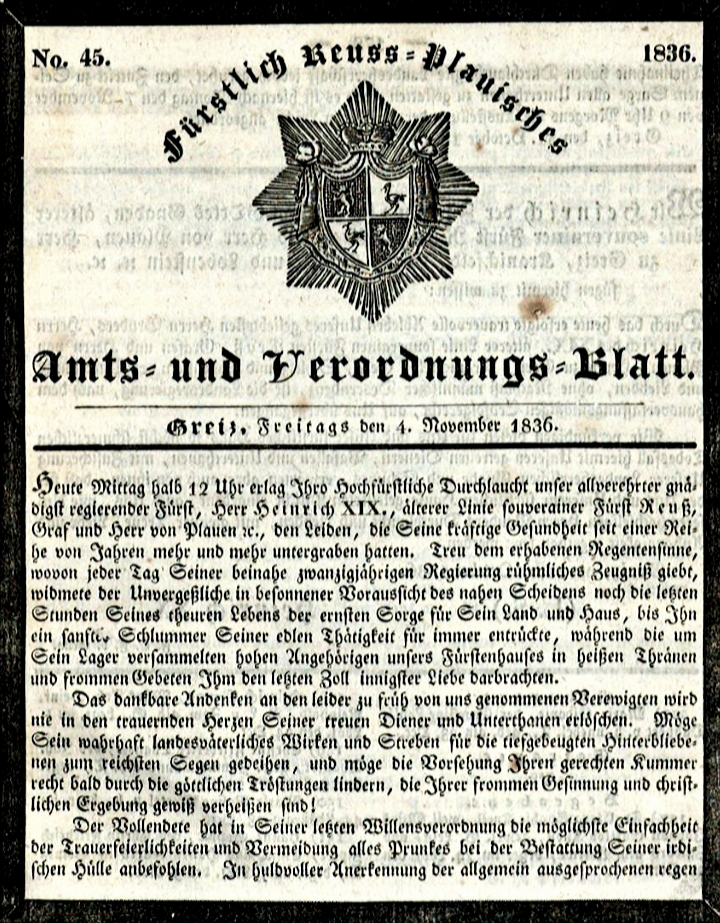
Death notice for Heinrich XIX

At his death in 1836, having no male heir, the Head of the House Reuss of Greiz passed to his younger brother Heinrich XX.

== Ancestry ==
Ancestors of Heinrich XIX, Prince Reuss of Greiz

8. Count Heinrich II Reuss of Obergreiz
4. Heinrich XI, Prince Reuss of Greiz
9. Countess Sophie Charlotte of Bothmer
2. Heinrich XIII, Prince Reuss of Greiz
10. Heinrich XXIV, Count Reuss of Köstritz
5. Countess Conradine Reuss of Köstritz
11. Baroness Marie Eleonore Emma of Promnitz-Dittersbach
1. Heinrich XIX, Prince Reuss of Greiz
12. Charles August, Prince of Nassau-Weilburg
6. Charles Christian, Prince of Nassau-Weilburg
13. Princess Augusta of Nassau-Idstein
3. Princess Wilhelmine Louise of Nassau-Weilburg
14. William IV, Prince of Orange
7. Princess Carolina of Orange-Nassau
15. Anne, Princess Royal

== References and sources ==
- L'Allemagne dynastique, Huberty, Giraud, Magdelaine, Reference: I 333
- Gehrlein Thomas, The House of Reuss - Older and Younger line Börde Verlag 2006, ISBN 978-3-9810315-3-9

Heinrich XIX, Prince Reuss of Greiz House Reuss of Greiz Cadet branch of the House of Reuss Born: 1 March 1790 Died: 31 October 1836
Regnal titles
Preceded by Heinrich XIII	Prince Reuss of Greiz; 1817 – 1836	Succeeded by Heinrich XX
