= Philip, Landgrave of Hesse-Homburg =

Philip
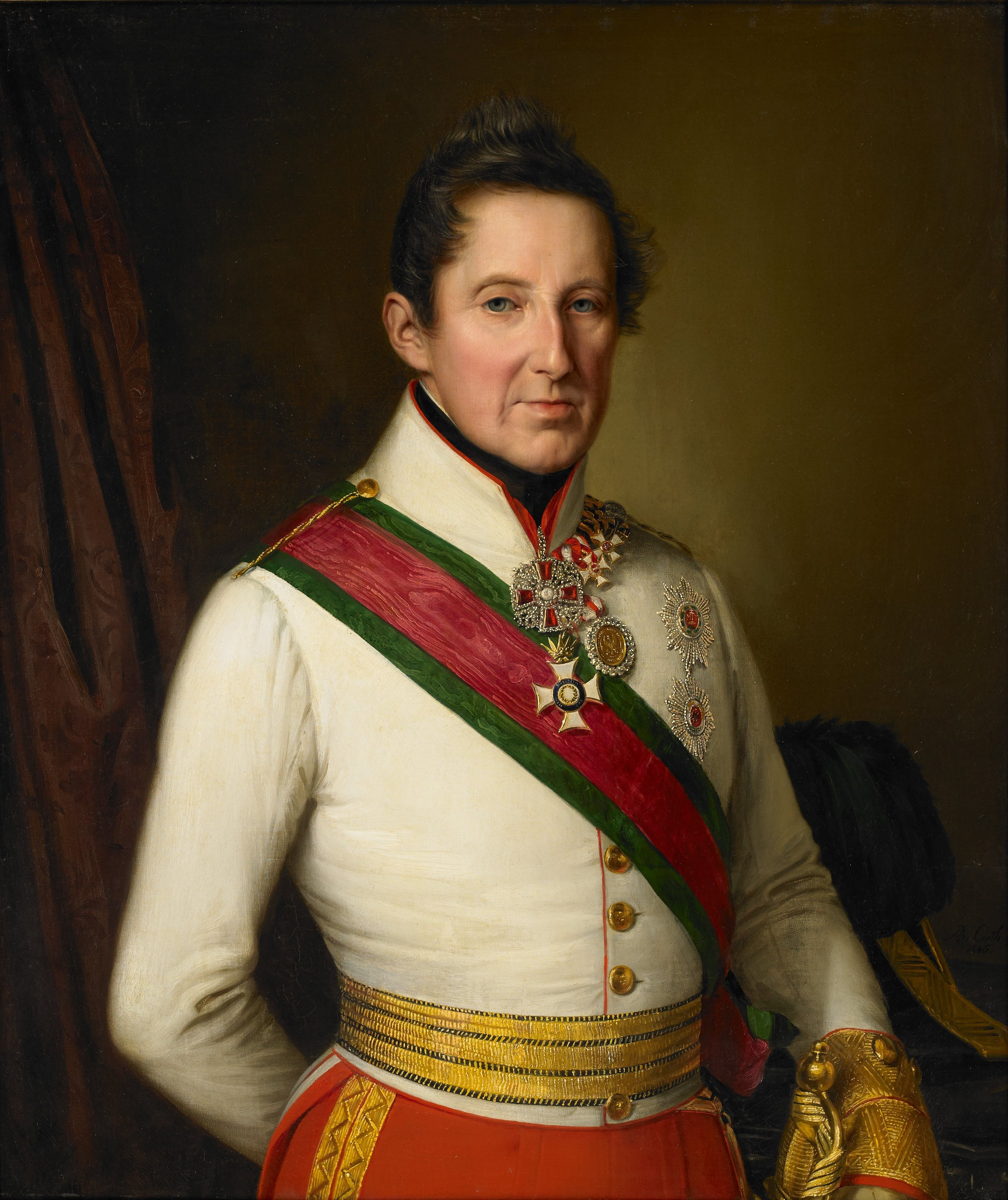
- Portrait of Philip, c. 1846

Landgrave of Hesse-Homburg
- Reign: 19 January 1839 – 15 December 1846
- Predecessor: Louis William
- Successor: Gustav
- Born: 11 March 1779; Homburg
- Died: 15 December 1846 (aged 67); Homburg
- Burial: Crypt of Bad Homburg Castle
- Spouse: Rosalie Antonie, Countess of Naumburg, Baroness Schimmelpfennig von der Oye, née Pototschnig
- House: Hesse
- Father: Frederick V, Landgrave of Hesse-Homburg
- Mother: Landgravine Caroline of Hesse-Darmstadt

Philip August Frederick (11 March 1779 – 15 December 1846) was Landgrave of Hesse-Homburg from 19 January 1839 until his death. He was a field marshal in the imperial Austrian army.

== Life ==
He was the third son of Frederick V, Landgrave of Hesse-Homburg, and his wife Caroline. Landgravine Caroline was a daughter of Louis IX, Landgrave of Hesse-Darmstadt, and Countess Palatine Caroline of Zweibrücken, who had received the nickname the Great Landgravine from Johann Wolfgang Goethe.

In 1829, Great Britain proposed to make Philip King of newly independent Greece. Russia supported this proposal, however, France opposed it. On 3 February 1830, the great powers settled on Prince Otto of Bavaria, who became the first modern King of Greece as Otto I in 1832.

He died on 1 December 1846 and was buried in the crypt of Bad Homburg Castle.

== Military career ==
In 1794, he joined the Hesse-Darmstadt brigade, which was stationed in the Netherlands. He held the rank of captain and was taken prisoner by the French. He was released ten months later, after his relatives had bought his freedom.

In 1796, he joined the Austrian army. He took part in the campaigns of 1798, 1799 and 1800. After the Treaty of Lunéville, he was stationed in Lviv. In 1805, he was promoted, first to lieutenant colonel, then to colonel and was appointed commander of the Infantry Regiment No. 2 Archduke Ferdinand.

He fought under Archduke Charles in the Battle of Caldiero in 1805 and in the battles of Battle of Landshut and Eckmühl. After the Battle of Aspern-Essling, he was promoted to major general on the battlefield, for his outstanding performance. He was injured during the Battle of Wagram and subsequently received the Military Order of Maria Theresa.

He was transferred to Vienna and his brigade was part of an army corps led by Karl Philipp, Prince of Schwarzenberg. In 1813, he was promoted to Feldmarschallleutnant and fought in the battles of Dresden, Kulm and Lindenau. He briefly served as governor of the Grand Duchy of Frankfurt and the Principality of Isenburg. In February 1814, he assumed command of the 6th German army corps and marched into Lyon on 22 March.

In 1818 and 1820, he travelled to Russia and England, to carry out diplomatic missions. In 1821, during the early revolutionary of the Risorgimento, he was sent to Naples as commander of an Austrian division, and was then appointed governor of Naples. In 1825, he was transferred to Graz, in 1827 to Lviv and in 1829 back to Graz. In 1832, he was promoted to Feldzeugmeister.

On 28 November 1846, shortly before his death, he was promoted to field marshal. This was the highest rank ever achieved by members of the House of Hesse.

== Reign ==
In 1839, his elder brother Louis William died in Philip inherited Hesse-Homburg. In 1840, Philip was appointed as governor of Mainz; he left the government of his principality to his younger brother Gustav.

The two major events of his reign were:

- A lease agreement was closed with the brothers François (1806-1877) and Louis Blanc (1806-1852) to operate a casino in Bad Homburg
- In December 1844, the citizens of the landgraviate demanded a constitution — this can be seen as a precursor to the revolutions of 1848. Philip considered the proposed constitution, however, he eventually rejected the proposal.

Since Philip had no children, Gustav inherited Hesse-Homburg in 1846.

== Marriage ==
In 1838, Philip married morganatically with Rosalie Antonie, Baroness Schimmelpfennig von der Oye, née Pototschnig. Elector William II of Hesse-Kassel elevated her to Countess of Naumburg (after Naumburg Castle, in modern Nidderau). Philip's relatives nevertheless rejected her, on the grounds that she was not a member of the high nobility. The marriage remained childless.

His wife died on 21 February 1845; he survived her by nearly a year and a half. She was buried in the crypt of Bad Homburg Castle, where Philip would later be buried as well.

== Ancestry ==
Ancestors of Philip, Landgrave of Hesse-Homburg

16. Frederick II, Landgrave of Hesse-Homburg
8. Landgrave Casimir William of Hesse-Homburg
17. Princess Louise Elisabeth of Courland
4. Frederick IV, Landgrave of Hesse-Homburg
18. Wilhelm Moritz, Count of Solms-Braunfels
9. Countess Christine Charlotte of Solms-Braunfels
19. Landgravine Magdalene Sophie of Hesse-Homburg
2. Frederick V
20. Wilhelm Moritz, Count of Solms-Braunfels (= 18)
10. Friedrich Wilhelm, Prince of Solms-Braunfels
21. Landgravine Magdalene Sophie of Hesse-Homburg (= 19)
5. Countess Ulrike Louise of Solms-Braunfels
22. Karl Otto, Count of Solms-Laubach-Utphe and Tecklenburg
11. Countess Sophie Magdalena Benigna of Solms-Laubach-Utphe
23. Countess Louise of Schönburg-Waldenburg
1. Philip, Landgrave of Hesse-Homburg
24. Ernest Louis, Landgrave of Hesse-Darmstadt
12. Louis VIII, Landgrave of Hesse-Darmstadt
25. Margravine Dorothea Charlotte of Brandenburg-Ansbach
6. Louis IX, Landgrave of Hesse-Darmstadt
26. Johann Reinhard III of Hanau-Lichtenberg
13. Countess Charlotte of Hanau-Lichtenberg
27. Margravine Dorothea Friederike of Brandenburg-Ansbach
3. Landgravine Caroline of Hesse-Darmstadt
28. Christian II of Zweibrücken-Birkenfeld
14. Christian III, Count Palatine of Zweibrücken
29. Katharina Agathe of Rappoltstein
7. Countess Palatine Caroline of Zweibrücken
30. Louis Crato, Count of Nassau-Saarbrücken
15. Caroline of Nassau-Saarbrücken
31. Philippine Henriette of Hohenlohe-Langenburg

Philip, Landgrave of Hesse-Homburg House of Hesse Born: 11 March 1779 Died: 15 December 1846
| Preceded by Louis William | Landgrave of Hesse-Homburg; 1839-1846 | Succeeded by Gustav |
