= Princess Elizabeth of the United Kingdom =

Landgravine of Hesse-Homburg from 1820 to 1829

Princess Elizabeth
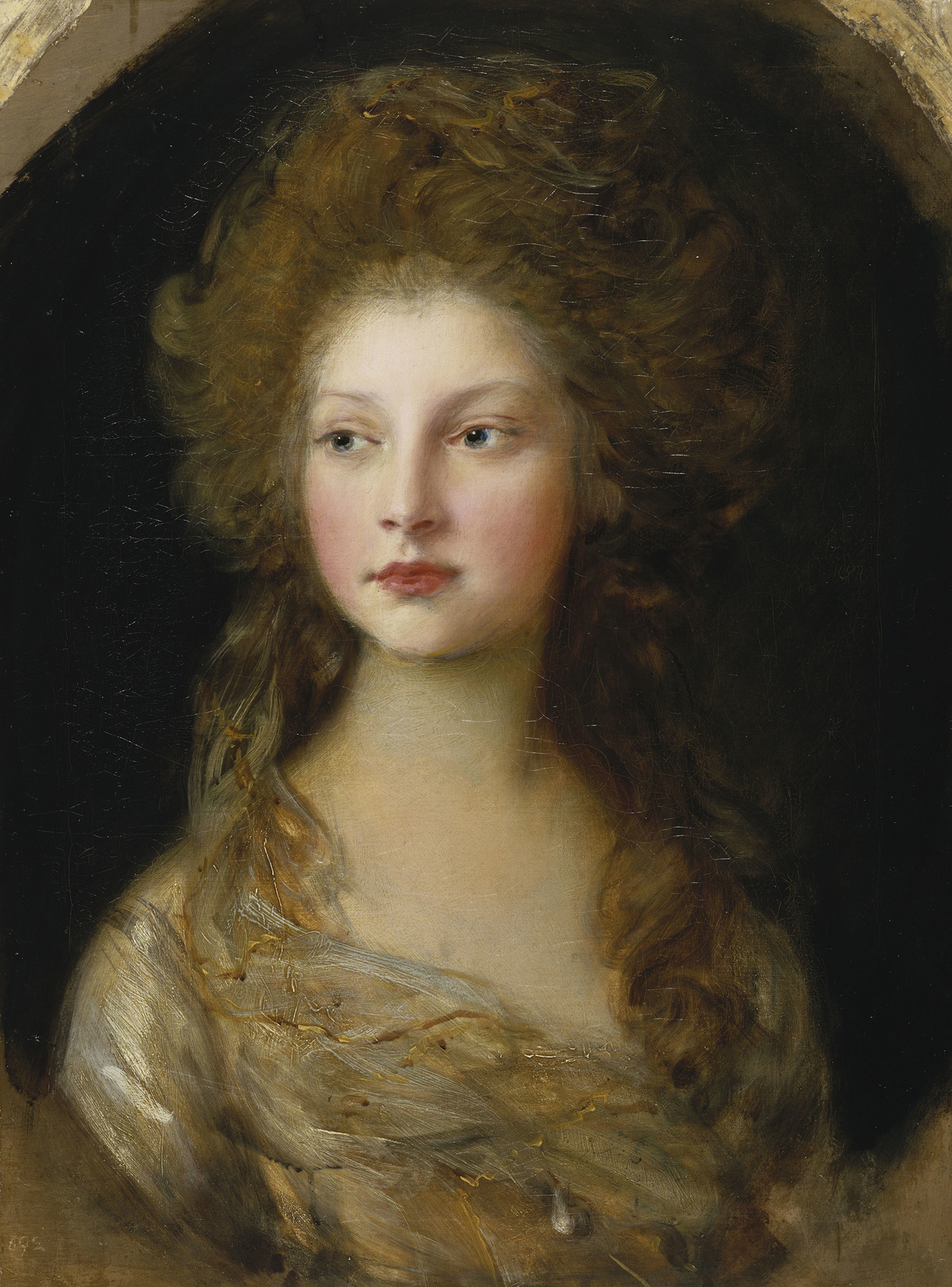

Landgravine consort of Hesse-Homburg
- Tenure: 20 January 1820 – 2 April 1829
- Born: 22 May 1770; Buckingham House, London, England
- Died: 10 January 1840 (aged 69); Free City of Frankfurt
- Burial: 17 January 1840; Mausoleum of the Landgraves, Homburg
- Spouse: Frederick VI, Landgrave of Hesse-Homburg (m. 1818; died 1829)
- House: Hanover
- Father: George III
- Mother: Charlotte of Mecklenburg-Strelitz

Princess Elizabeth (22 May 1770 – 10 January 1840), called Eliza, was the seventh child and third daughter of King George III and Queen Charlotte. After marrying the Landgrave of Hesse-Homburg, Frederick VI, she took permanent residence in Germany as landgravine.

== Early life ==
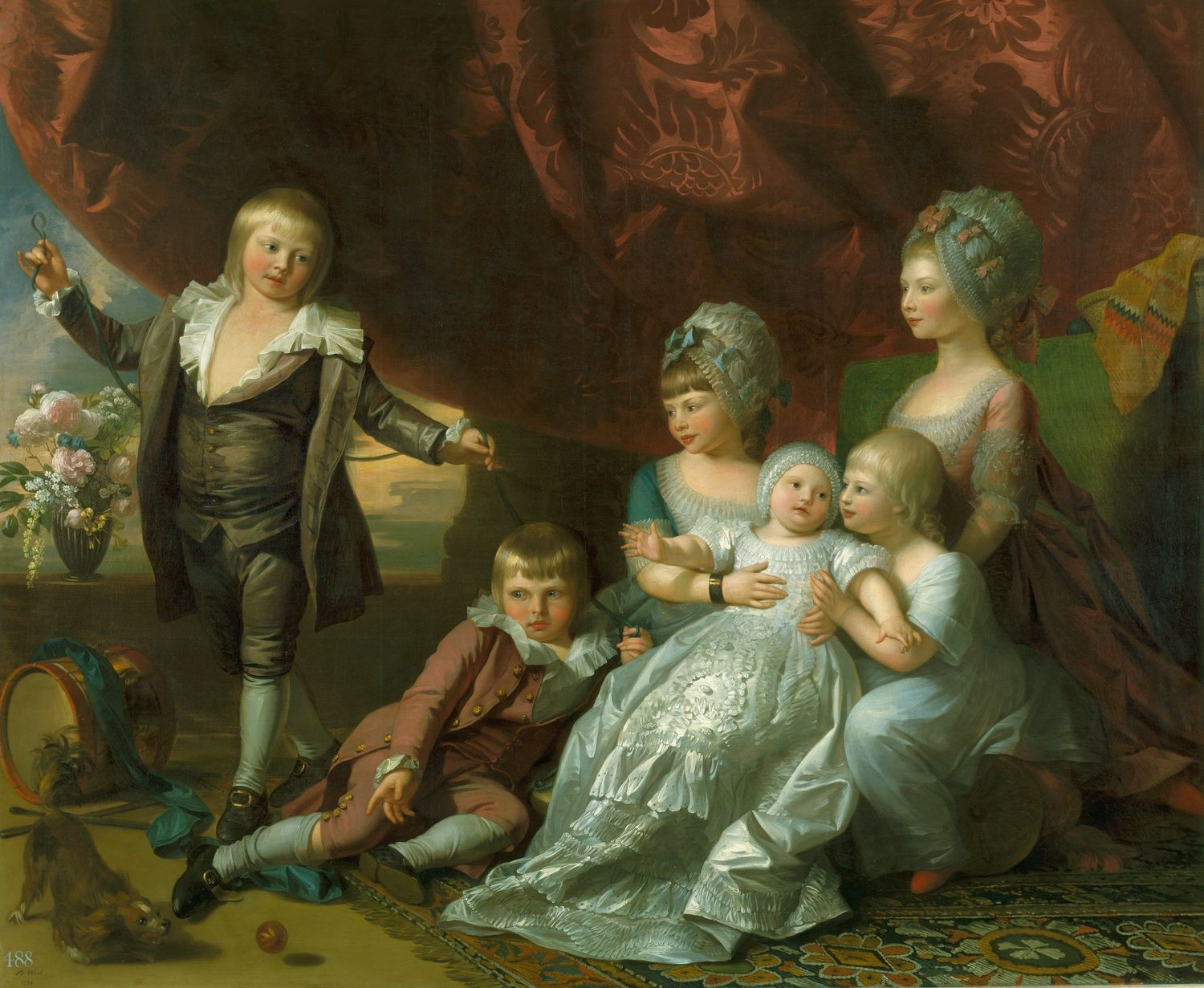
Princess Elizabeth with her siblings (Augusta, Ernest, Augustus, Adolphus, and Mary) in 1776, by Benjamin West. Elizabeth is the young girl in the blue dress.

Elizabeth was born at Buckingham House, London, on 22 May 1770. Her father was the reigning British monarch, George III, the eldest son of Frederick, Prince of Wales and Augusta of Saxe-Gotha. Her mother was Queen Charlotte (née Princess Charlotte of Mecklenburg-Strelitz). She was christened in the Great Council Chamber at St. James's Palace, on 17 June 1770 by Frederick Cornwallis, the Archbishop of Canterbury. Her godparents were the Hereditary Prince of Hesse-Cassel (her paternal first cousin once-removed, for whom the Earl of Hertford, Lord Chamberlain, stood proxy), the Princess of Nassau-Weilburg (her paternal first cousin once-removed, for whom the Dowager Countess of Effingham, former Lady of the Bedchamber to the Queen, stood proxy) and the Crown Princess of Sweden (another paternal first cousin once-removed, for whom the Countess of Holderness, Lady of the Bedchamber to the Queen, stood proxy).

The Princess' upbringing was very sheltered and she spent most of her time with her parents and sisters. King George and Queen Charlotte were keen to shelter their children, particularly the girls. However, in 1812, Elizabeth purchased The Priory at Old Windsor in Berkshire as her private residence.

== Character and interests ==
Elizabeth was known for her insistently optimistic attitude in spite of her stilted existence. Although she longed for marriage and a family of her own, Elizabeth was determined to enjoy her life by exploring and developing her varied interests and hobbies. Elizabeth was a talented artist, producing several books of her own engravings to benefit various charities. She painted, learned printing techniques, silhouette cutting, painting upholstery and curtains, embroidery, and principles of architecture and gardening. She was also in close contact with court painters such as Benjamin West, Thomas Gainsborough and William Beechey, as well as the engraver Francesco Bartolozzi.

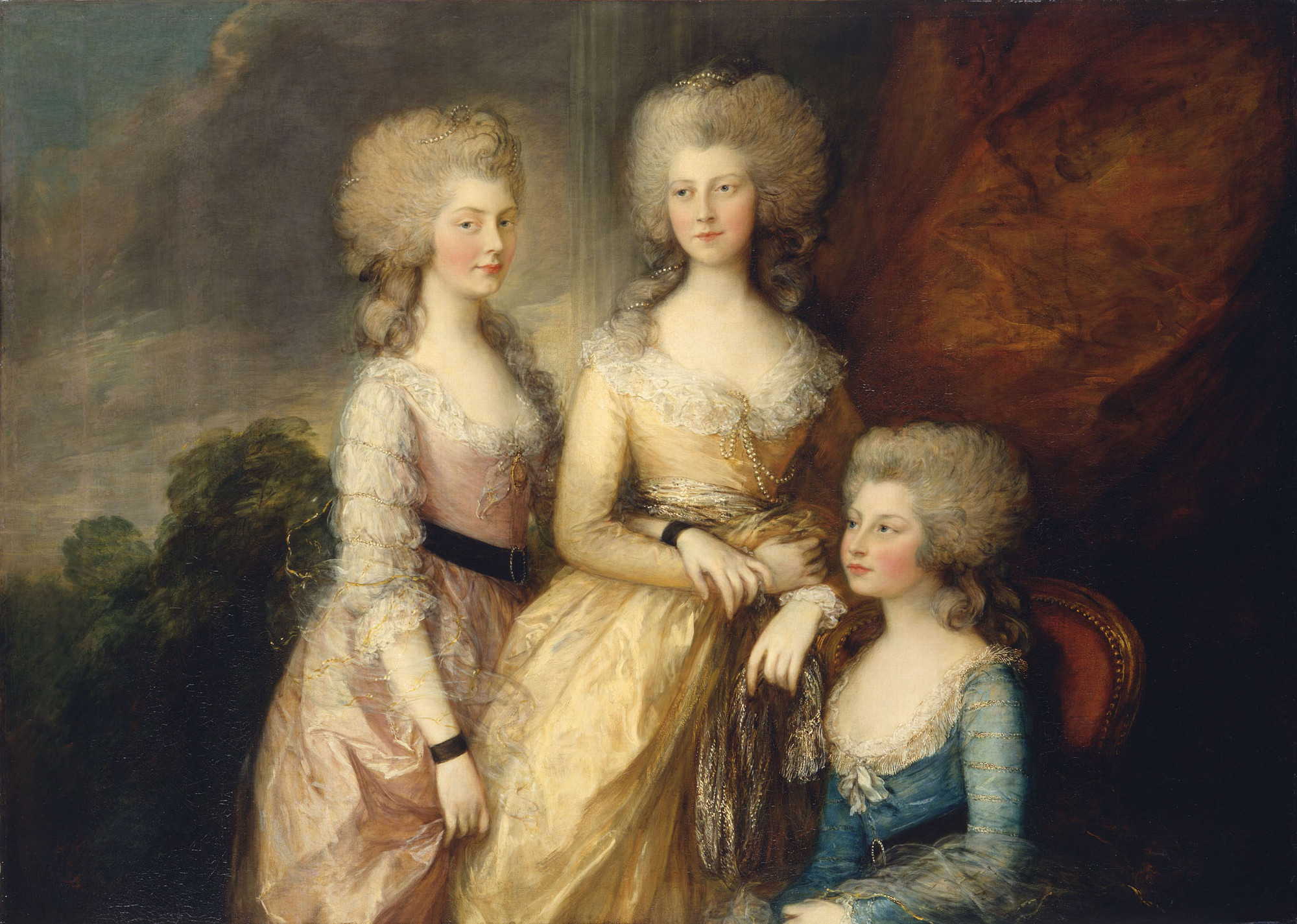
Princess Elizabeth (right) with her two elder sisters (Augusta and Charlotte), by Thomas Gainsborough, 1784

She was the only one of George III's children to share his interests in agriculture, running her own model farm at a rented cottage in Old Windsor. She took great delight in the products of her garden, as well as the eggs, milk, and butter from her livestock. Elizabeth's family teased her for her fondness of rich food and drink. She was very sensitive to criticism of her weight.

Elizabeth was also known for her well-developed sense of humour and maintained a large collection of jokes and witticisms. She had an open and plainspoken nature, and disliked excessive "politeness". She was closest to her siblings Augusta and Adolphus, Duke of Cambridge and — uniquely among her sisters — Edward, Duke of Kent and Strathearn. Elizabeth was also the closest daughter to their mother, which contributed to Charlotte's reluctance to let her marry.

== Possible romantic relationships ==
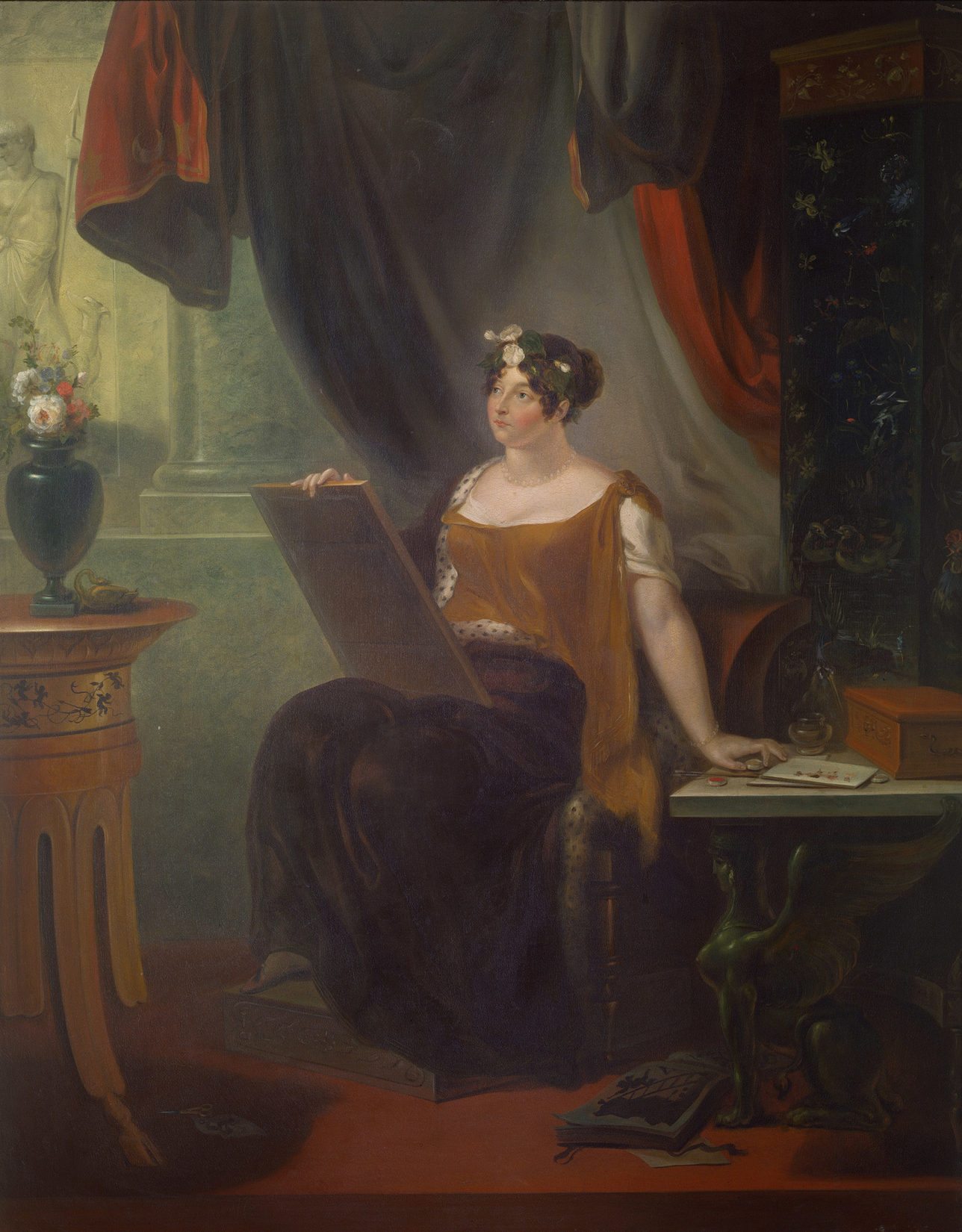
Princess Elizabeth in 1807, by Peter Edward Stroehling

It is alleged that Elizabeth went through a form of marriage with George Ramus (1747–1808) and bore him a daughter, Eliza, in 1788. George Ramus was the son of Nicholas Ramus, who had been Page to Elizabeth's father King George. Any such marriage would have been null and void under the Royal Marriages Act 1772, but several of Elizabeth's brothers contracted similar alliances with commoners before marrying German princesses later in life. Eliza Ramus (1788–1869) was allegedly adopted and brought up by her uncle, Henry Ramus (1755–1822) of the East India Company. She married James Money (1770–1833), also of the East India Company, and her daughter Marian Martha (1806–1869) married George Wynyard Battye (1805–1888), a Bengal Judge. In widowhood, Eliza Ramus lived at 28 Chester Square in London, where she educated her Battye grandsons, all ten of whom became army officers, and cared for them when they were on sick or convalescent leave from India.

Largely denied opportunities to marry men of royal blood, several of Elizabeth's sisters embarked on romantic relationships with equerries and other high ranking men at court. Elizabeth herself may have had such a relationship with diplomat Alleyne Fitzherbert, 1st Baron St. Helens. St. Helens was much respected by George III, who created him a Lord of the Bedchamber in 1804. Seventeen years older than Elizabeth, St. Helens was a frank, practical, and sharp-witted character known to dislike court life, qualities which Elizabeth shared. She referred to him as, "a dear and valuable saint," and said of him in a letter to her companion Lady Harcourt, "There is no man I love so well, and his tenderness to me has never varied, and that is a thing I never forget." Elizabeth later wrote that she pined for St. Helens, eager to see him, "at all times, hours, minutes, days, nights, etc." Elizabeth later commissioned a portrait of St. Helens from noted enamelist Henry Pierce Bone, evidence of her great attachment to him. St. Helens in turn kept an enamel miniature of Elizabeth, also painted by Bone.

== Marriage ==
Elizabeth had little interest in stiff court etiquette, she was spirited and resolute and longed for a household of her own. In 1808 Elizabeth was reluctantly obliged to decline a proposal from the exiled Duke of Orléans (later King of the French as Louis Philippe I) due to his Catholicism and her mother's opposition.

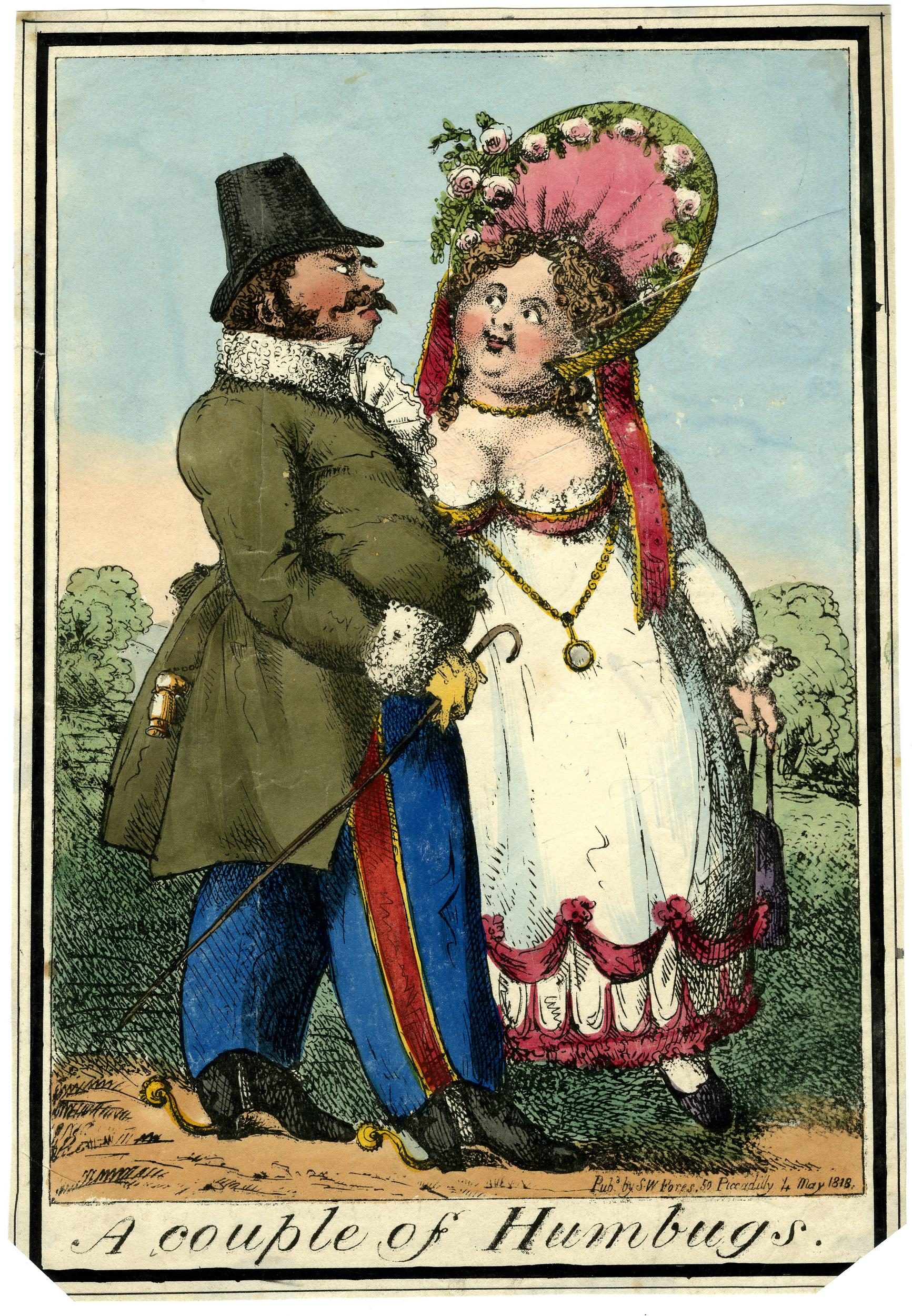
Contemporary caricature by British publisher S. W. Fores on the marriage of Princess Elisabeth to Hereditary Prince Frederick of Hesse-Homburg

During a ball in the British royal court in 1814 Elizabeth got to know the German Prince Frederick of Hesse-Homburg, the heir to the throne of Hesse-Homburg, one of the smallest states in the German Confederation. When Elizabeth saw the Austrian officer in his elegant Hussar's uniform, she is supposed to have said, "If he is single, I will marry him!" Four years later, Elizabeth received a letter indicating that Frederick was asking for her hand in marriage. For many years, Frederick had categorically refused to enter into marriage, against the urging of his father and the parliament of Hesse-Homburg. But during the Congress of Vienna, the Duke of Kent and Hesse-Homburg's federal envoy, Johann Isaak von Gerning, arranged the connection. The already 48-year-old Elizabeth was immediately interested, and her surviving sisters were supportive. Although Frederick was said to be overweight and smell constantly of tobacco from his beloved meerschaum pipes, Elizabeth persevered in her goal of marrying him in order to free herself from her domineering mother and find her own role by assuming the position of a Landesmutter ("mother of the country"). Queen Charlotte refused to permit the union for weeks fearing Elizabeth's unavoidable move to Germany, but finally acquiesced when her daughter refused to back down.

Against all resistance, the wedding took place on 7 April 1818 in the private chapel in Buckingham Palace in Westminster. Elizabeth wore a dress made of silver tissue and Brussels lace with ostrich feathers adorning her hair. She was led to the altar by her second eldest brother, the Duke of York. Neither her eldest brother the Prince Regent nor her father attended the wedding, kept away by gout and severe mental illness respectively. The new couple honeymooned at the Prince Regent's Royal Pavilion in Brighton.

It was not a real "love match", in spite of the mutual understanding and respect; in fact it was an agreement with which both were satisfied. Elizabeth was able to escape the constrictive environment of her home by moving to Germany with her husband, and Frederick gained many advantages by becoming allied with the British royal family. However, Frederick remarked during his honeymoon that he was surprised to be happy and content in Elizabeth's presence; Elizabeth found her new husband to be intelligent, generous, and affectionate. The marriage lasted just a little over ten years, until Frederick's sudden death in 1829, and was described as very happy.

== Later life ==
On 20 January 1820, Frederick succeeded his father as the Landgrave of Hesse-Homburg. Thanks to Elizabeth's dowry and annual allowance, he was able to remodel the palace in Homburg. For her part, Landgravine Elizabeth could bid farewell to the rigid court etiquette she had disliked in England. She had roads built in her new home town and had the Gothic House in the palace's grounds built, took care of the restoration and conversion of the English Wing of the palace as well as of Meisenheim Castle (Duke Wolfgang Wing) and was involved in caring for the poor. She sourced seeds and seedlings from England and oversaw their yields in the Landgravial Gardens. She owned a large library and an important collection of porcelain. She also continued her artistic activities. Despite her large appanage from London, the landgrave's debt increased as a result of her ambitious projects from 250,000 guilders in 1820 to 1,175,000 guilders nine years later.

After her husband died in 1829, she lived with her small court alternately in Homburg, in her house in Frankfurt, and at the court of her favorite brother Prince Adolphus, Duke of Cambridge, in Hanover (Leineschloss and Herrenhausen Palace). She also traveled regularly to London. Elizabeth founded a care center and school in Hanover for children of working mothers. While she was past childbearing age herself, Elizabeth found fulfillment in working with the children attending the school. She lived to see the accession of her niece Queen Victoria in the United Kingdom and of her brother Ernest Augustus in the Kingdom of Hanover in 1837.

She died on 10 January 1840 at age 69 in Frankfurt, Hesse, Germany and is buried in the crypt of Homburg Castle. Her niece, Princess Caroline, the wife of Henry XX, Prince Reuss of Greiz, inherited her artistic and collected estate, which came to Greiz around 1848.

== Exhibition ==
- 2010: Das graphische Werk der Landgräfin Elizabeth 1770–1840 (The Graphic Works of Landgräfin Elizabeth), Museum im Gotischen Haus, Bad Homburg, Germany

== Titles, styles, honours and arms ==
=== Titles and styles ===
- 22 May 1770 – 7 April 1818: Her Royal Highness The Princess Elizabeth
- 7 April 1818 – 20 January 1820: Her Royal Highness The Hereditary Princess of Hesse-Homburg
- 20 January 1820 – 2 April 1829: Her Royal Highness The Landgravine of Hesse-Homburg
- 2 April 1829 – 10 January 1840: Her Royal Highness The Dowager Landgravine of Hesse-Homburg

=== Arms ===
As of 1789, as a daughter of the sovereign, Elizabeth had use of the arms of the kingdom, differenced by a label argent of three points, the centre point bearing a cross gules, the outer points each bearing a rose gules.

== Ancestors ==
Ancestors of Princess Elizabeth of the United Kingdom

8. George II of Great Britain
4. Frederick, Prince of Wales
9. Princess Caroline of Brandenburg-Ansbach
2. George III of the United Kingdom
10. Frederick II, Duke of Saxe-Gotha-Altenburg
5. Princess Augusta of Saxe-Gotha
11. Princess Magdalena Augusta of Anhalt-Zerbst
1. Princess Elizabeth of the United Kingdom
12. Adolphus Frederick II, Duke of Mecklenburg-Strelitz
6. Duke Charles Louis Frederick of Mecklenburg-Strelitz
13. Princess Christiane Emilie of Schwarzburg-Sondershausen
3. Princess Charlotte of Mecklenburg-Strelitz
14. Ernest Frederick I, Duke of Saxe-Hildburghausen
7. Princess Elisabeth Albertine of Saxe-Hildburghausen
15. Countess Sophia Albertine of Erbach-Erbach

Princess Elizabeth of the United Kingdom House of Hanover Cadet branch of the House of Welf Born: 22 May 1770 Died: 10 January 1840
German royalty
Preceded by Caroline of Hesse-Darmstadt	Landgravine consort of Hesse-Homburg; 20 January 1820 – 2 April 1829	Vacant Title next held by Louise of Anhalt-Dessau
