= Princess Louise of Anhalt-Dessau (1798–1858) =

Louise of Anhalt-Dessau
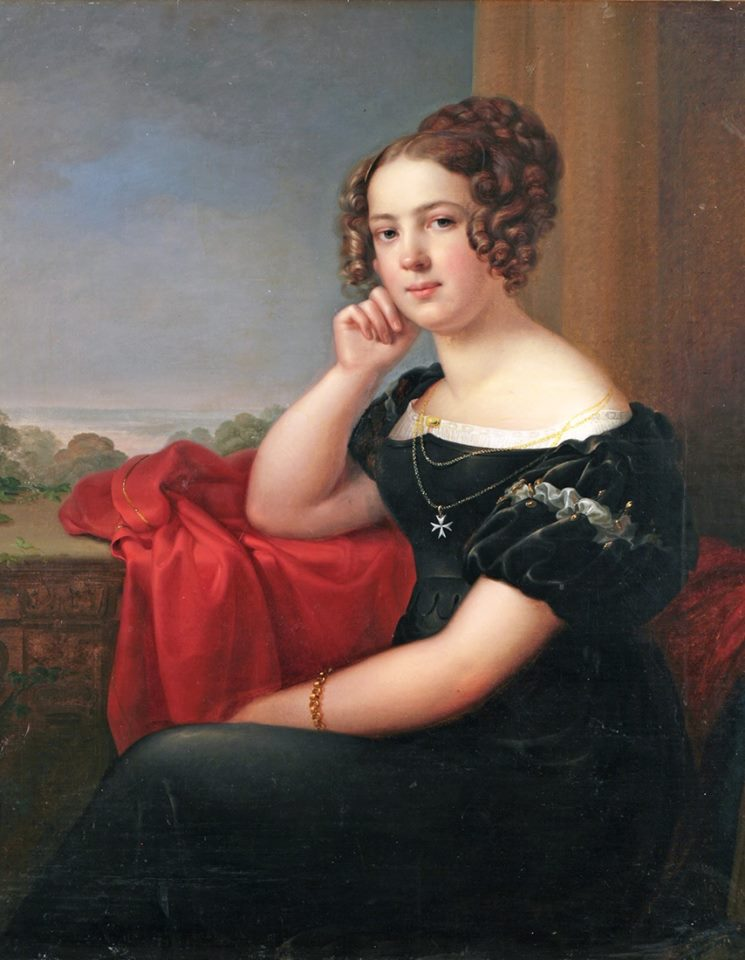

Landgravine of Hesse-Homburg
- Tenure: 15 December 1846 – 8 September 1848
- Born: 1 March 1798; Dessau, Anhalt, Holy Roman Empire
- Died: 11 June 1858 (aged 60); Bad Homburg, Hesse-Homburg
- Spouse: Gustav, Landgrave of Hesse-Homburg (m. 1818; died 1848)
- Issue: Karoline, Princess Reuss of Greiz; Princess Elisabeth; Prince Frederick
Names
- German: Luise Friederike
- House: Ascania
- Father: Frederick, Hereditary Prince of Anhalt-Dessau
- Mother: Amalie of Hesse-Homburg

Louise Fredericka of Anhalt-Dessau (German: Luise Friederike von Anhalt-Dessau) (1 March 1798 – 11 June 1858) was a member of the House of Ascania and a Princess of Anhalt-Dessau by birth. Through her marriage to Gustav, Landgrave of Hesse-Homburg, Louise became Landgravine consort of Hesse-Homburg from 1846 until 1848.

== Early life and education ==
Princess Louise was born on 1 March 1798 in Dessau as the fifth child and second daughter of Frederick, Hereditary Prince of Anhalt-Dessau and his wife Landgravine Amalie of Hesse-Homburg, daughter of Frederick V, Landgrave of Hesse-Homburg. Princess Louise was a deaf-mute from birth.

Until 1811, she was tutored by the poet Friedrich von Matthisson in Wörlitz.

== Marriage and issue ==
On 12 February 1818 in Dessau, Louise married her uncle, Gustav, Landgrave of Hesse-Homburg. Gustav was the brother of Louise's mother and the son of Frederick V, Landgrave of Hesse-Homburg and his wife Landgravine Caroline of Hesse-Darmstadt.

Gustav and Louise had three children:

- Princess Caroline (1819–1872); married in 1839 to Henry XX, Prince Reuss of Greiz (1794–1859)
- Princess Elisabeth (1823–1864)
- Prince Frederick (1830–1848)

== Death ==
Landgrave Gustav died on 8 September 1848 in Bad Homburg. Princess Louise survived her husband by nine years and died on 11 June 1858 in Bad Homburg.

German royalty
Vacant Title last held by Princess Elizabeth of the United Kingdom	Landgravine consort of Hesse-Homburg; 15 December 1846 – 8 September 1848	Succeeded by none
