= Heinrich XIII, Prince Reuss of Greiz =

Prince Reuss of Greiz from 1800 to 1817

Heinrich XIII
- Prince Reuss of Greiz
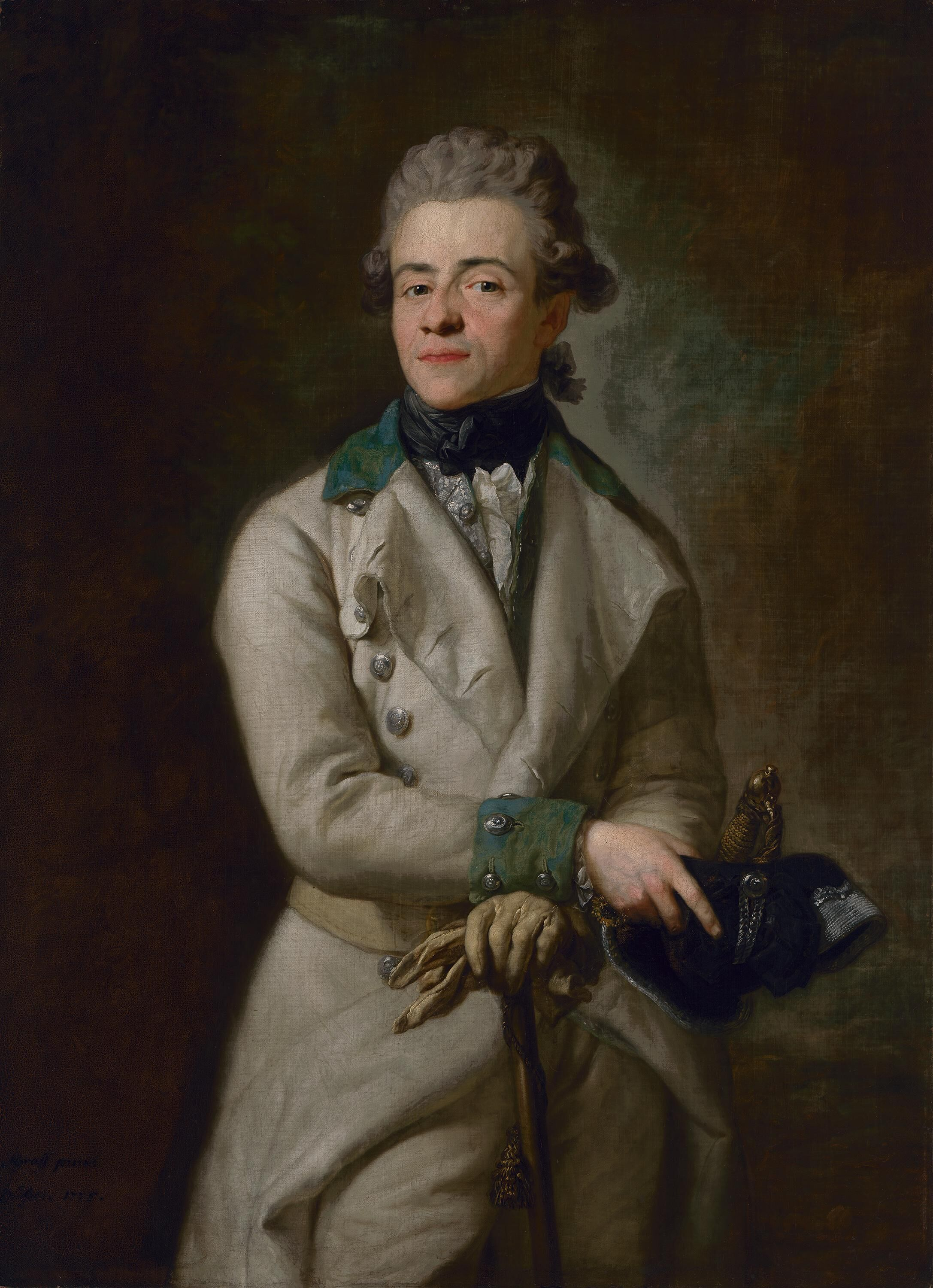
- 1775 portrait
- Reign: 28 June 1800 – 29 January 1817
- Born: 16 February 1747; Greiz, Reuss
- Died: 29 January 1817 (aged 69); Greiz, Reuss Elder Line
- Spouse: Princess Wilhelmine Louise of Nassau-Weilburg (m. 1786)
- Issue: Prince Heinrich XVIII; Heinrich XIX, Prince Reuss of Greiz; Heinrich XX, Prince Reuss of Greiz
- House: House Reuss of Greiz
- Father: Heinrich XI, Prince Reuss of Greiz
- Mother: Countess Conradine Reuss of Köstritz

Heinrich XIII, Prince Reuss of Greiz (German: Heinrich XIII Fürst Reuß zu Greiz; 16 February 1747 – 29 January 1817) was Prince Reuss of Greiz from 1800 to 1817.

== Early life ==
Heinrich XIII was born at Greiz, Reuss, third child of Heinrich XI, Prince Reuss of Greiz, son of Count Heinrich II Reuss of Obergreiz and Countess Sophie Charlotte of Bothmer, and his wife Countess Conradine Reuss of Köstritz, daughter of Heinrich XXIV, Count Reuss of Köstritz and Baroness Marie Eleonore Emma of Promnitz-Dittersbach.

== Prince Reuss of Greiz ==
On the death of his father on 28 June 1800, Heinrich succeeded him as Prince Reuss of Greiz.

After the devastation of Greiz by a fire in 1802, Heinrich XIII ordered that the city be rebuilt in a neoclassical style, and he moved his residence from the Oberes Schloss (Upper Castle) to the Unteres Schloss (Lower Castle), to be more in contact with the people and social life of the Principality.

Heinrich XIII distinguished himself in his military service to Austria as a field marshal, to the point of being considered one of the Emperor Joseph II's best friends.

Heinrich XIII joined the Confederation of the Rhine in 1807 and later was a member of the German Confederation. At the Congress of Vienna he was involved in a territorial dispute with the Kingdom of Saxony, from which he emerged victorious and won the domain of the cities of Altgommla and Kühdorf.

== Marriage ==
Heinrich XIII was married on 9 January 1786 in Kirchheimbolanden to Princess Wilhelmine Louise of Nassau-Weilburg (1765–1837), fourth child and second daughter of Charles Christian, Prince of Nassau-Weilburg, and his wife, Princess Carolina of Orange-Nassau.

They had four children:

- Prince Heinrich XVIII Reuss of Greiz (31 March 1787 – 31 March 1787)
- Unnamed daughter (28 November 1788 – 28 November 1788)
- Heinrich XIX, Prince Reuss of Greiz (1 March 1790 – 31 October 1836), married in 1822 to Princess Gasparine of Rohan-Rochefort, had issue.
- Heinrich XX, Prince Reuss of Greiz (29 June 1794 – 8 November 1859), married firstly in 1834 to Princess Sophie of Löwenstein-Wertheim- Rosenberg, no issue, Princess Sophie died in 1838. Married secondly in 1839 to Landgravine Karoline of Hesse-Homburg, had issue.

== Notes and sources ==
- L'Allemagne dynastique, Huberty, Giraud, Magdelaine, Reference: I 321
- Gehrlein Thomas, The House of Reuss – Older and Younger line Börde Verlag 2006, ISBN 978-3-9810315-3-9

Heinrich XIII, Prince Reuss of Greiz House Reuss of Greiz Cadet branch of the House of Reuss Born: 16 February 1747 Died: 29 January 1817
Regnal titles
Preceded by Heinrich XI	Prince Reuss of Greiz; 1800 – 1817	Succeeded by Heinrich XIX
