= Louise, Princess Reuss of Greiz =

Princess Wilhelmine Louise
- Princess Reuss of Greiz
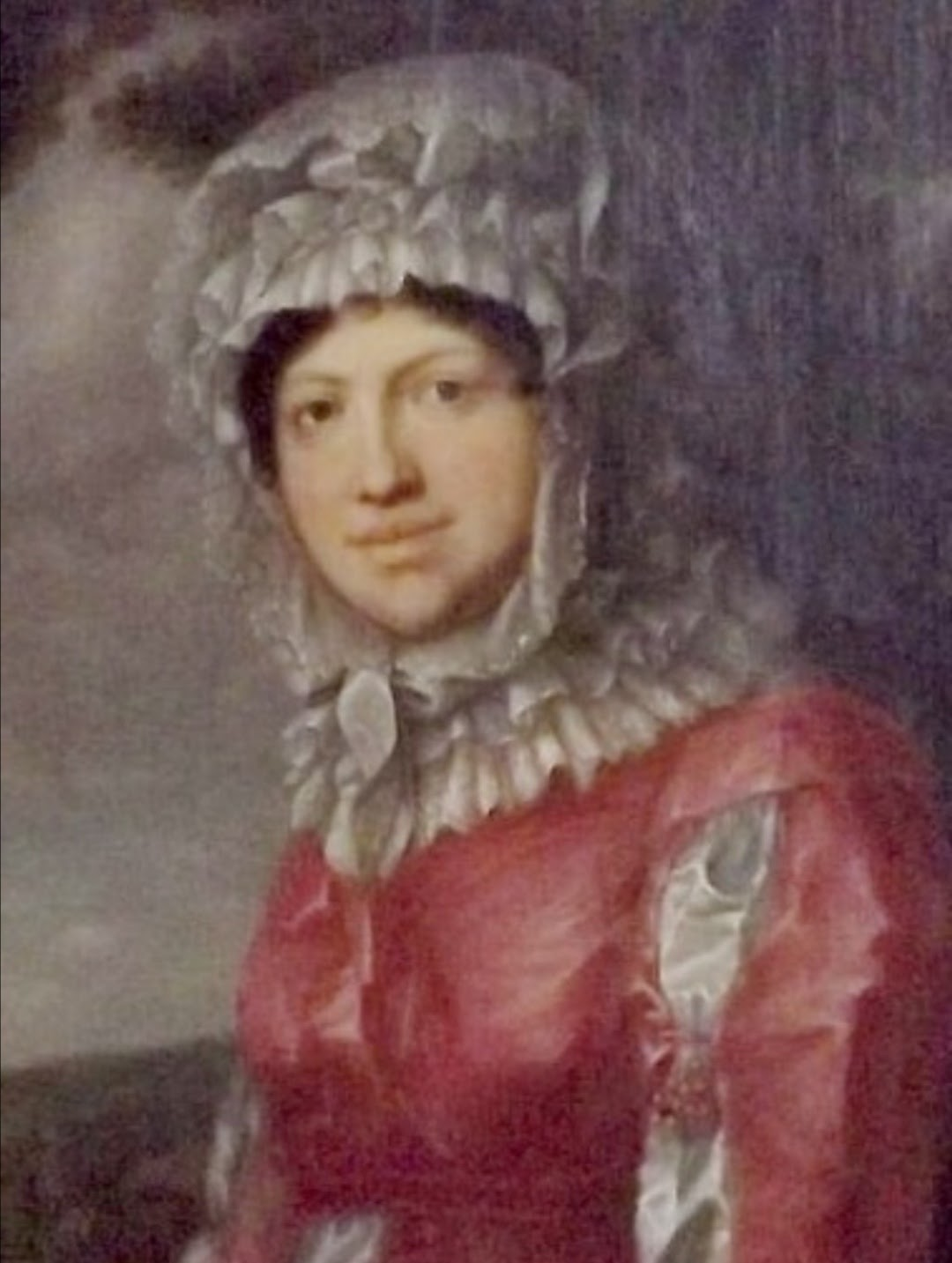
- Born: 28 September 1765; The Hague, Dutch Republic
- Died: 10 October 1837 (aged 72); Greiz, Principality of Reuss-Greiz
- Spouse: Heinrich XIII, Prince Reuss of Greiz (m. 1786; died 1817)
- Issue: Prince Heinrich XVIII Reuss of Greiz; Heinrich XIX, Prince Reuss of Greiz; Heinrich XX, Prince Reuss of Greiz
- House: Nassau-Weilburg
- Father: Charles Christian, Prince of Nassau-Weilburg
- Mother: Princess Carolina of Orange-Nassau

Wilhelmine Louise, Princess Reuss of Greiz, born as Princess Wilhelmine Luise of Nassau-Weilburg (28 September 1765, in The Hague – 10 October 1837, in Greiz) was a German princess. She was a Princess consort of Reuss of Greiz from 1800 until 1817, and was the daughter of Prince Charles Christian, Duke of Nassau-Weilburg, and Carolina of Orange-Nassau, daughter of William IV, Prince of Orange.

== Marriage and children ==
Louise married on 9 January 1786 in Kirchheimbolanden to Heinrich XIII, future Prince Reuss of Greiz (1747–1817), third child of Heinrich XI, Prince Reuss of Greiz, and Countess Conradine Reuss of Köstritz (daughter of Heinrich XXIV, Count Reuss of Köstritz and Baroness Marie Eleonore Emma of Promnitz-Dittersbach).

They had four children:

- Prince Heinrich XVIII Reuss of Greiz (31 March 1787 – 31 March 1787)
- Stillborn daughter (28 November 1788 – 28 November 1788)
- Heinrich XIX, Prince Reuss of Greiz (1 March 1790 – 31 October 1836), married in 1822 to Princess Gasparine of Rohan-Rochefort, had issue.
- Heinrich XX, Prince Reuss of Greiz (29 June 1794 – 8 November 1859), married firstly in 1834 to Princess Sophie of Löwenstein-Wertheim-Rosenberg, no issue, Princess Sophie died in 1838; married secondly in 1839 to Landgravine Karoline of Hesse-Homburg, had issue.

== Ancestry ==
Ancestors of Louise, Princess Reuss of Greiz

8. John Ernst, Count of Nassau-Weilburg
4. Charles August, Prince of Nassau-Weilburg
9. Countess Maria Polyxena of Leiningen-Dagsburg-Hardenburg
2. Charles Christian, Prince of Nassau-Weilburg
10. George August, Count of Nassau-Idstein
5. Princess Auguste Friederike of Nassau-Idstein
11. Princess Henriette Dorothea of Oettingen-Oettingen
1. Princess Wilhelmine Luise of Nassau-Weilburg
12. John William Friso, Prince of Orange
6. William IV, Prince of Orange
13. Landgravine Marie Louise of Hesse-Kassel
3. Princess Carolina of Orange-Nassau
14. George II of Great Britain
7. Anne, Princess Royal
15. Caroline of Ansbach
