= Heinrich XX, Prince Reuss of Greiz =

Heinrich XX
- Prince Reuss of Greiz
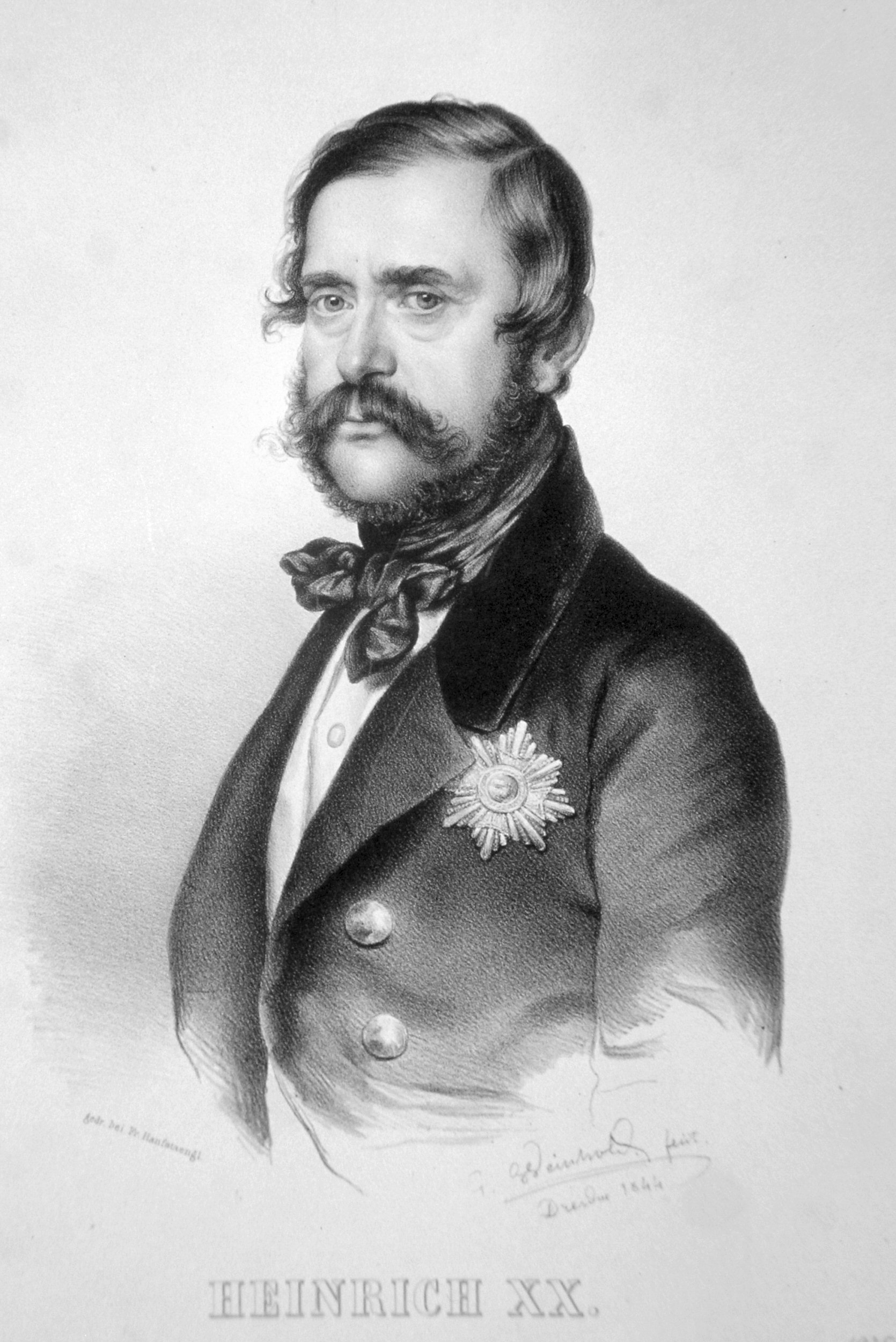
- 1841 lithograph

Prince of Greiz
- Reign: 1836–1859
- Predecessor: Prince Heinrich XIX
- Successor: Prince Heinrich XXII
- Born: 29 June 1794; Offenbach, Landgraviate of Hesse-Darmstadt
- Died: 8 November 1859 (aged 65); Greiz, Principality of Reuss-Greiz
- Spouse: Princess Sophie of Löwenstein-Wertheim-Rosenberg (m. 1834; died 1838) Princess Caroline of Hesse-Homburg (m. 1839)
- Issue: Princess Christiane; Prince Heinrich XXI; Prince Heinrich XXII, Prince of Reuss-Greiz; Prince Heinrich XXIII; Princess Marie, Countess of Ysenburg and Büdingen-Meerholz
- House: House Reuss of Greiz
- Father: Heinrich XIII, Prince Reuss of Greiz
- Mother: Princess Wilhelmine Louise of Nassau-Weilburg

Heinrich XX, Prince Reuss of Greiz (German: Heinrich XX Fürst Reuß zu Greiz; 29 June 1794 – 8 November 1859) was Prince Reuss of Greiz from 1836 to 1859.

== Early life ==
Heinrich XX was born at Offenbach, Landgraviate of Hesse-Darmstadt, younger surviving son of Heinrich XIII, Prince Reuss of Greiz (son of Heinrich XI, Prince Reuss of Greiz and Countess Conradine Reuss of Köstritz) and his wife, Princess Wilhelmine Louise of Nassau-Weilburg (daughter of Charles Christian, Prince of Nassau-Weilburg and Princess Carolina of Orange-Nassau).

== Prince Reuss of Greiz ==
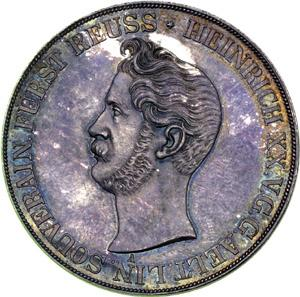
Coin of Prince Heinrich XX

At the death of his elder brother on 31 October 1836, Heinrich XX succeeded as the Prince Reuss of Greiz because of the Salic law that applied in the German principalities, his brother had died with no male heir.

Heinrich XX kept the principality administration based on absolutist principles at least until 1848 when because of the Revolution, was forced to issue a constitution but never came into force. The Prince, however, distinguished himself in military service in favor of the Austrian Empire.

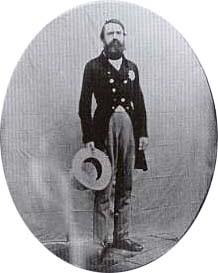
Photograph of Prince Heinrich XX, late 1850s

== Marriage ==
Heinrich XX married on 25 November 1834 at Castle Haid in Haid to Princess Sophie of Löwenstein-Wertheim-Rosenberg, third daughter of Karl, Prince of Löwenstein-Wertheim-Rosenberg, and Countess Sophie Luise of Windisch-Graetz. They had no children.

He married secondly on 1 October 1839 in Homburg vor der Höhe to Princess Caroline Amalie of Hesse-Homburg, eldest daughter of Gustav, Landgrave of Hesse-Homburg, and Princess Louise of Anhalt-Dessau.

They had five children:

- Princess Hermine Reuss of Greiz (25 December 1840 – 4 January 1890); married in 1862 Prince Hugo of Schönburg-Waldenburg, had issue.
- Prince Heinrich XXI Reuss of Greiz (11 February 1844 – 14 June 1844)
- Heinrich XXII, Prince Reuss of Greiz (28 March 1846 – 19 April 1902)
- Prince Heinrich XXIII Reuss of Greiz (27 June 1848 – 22 October 1861)
- Princess Marie Reuss of Greiz (19 March 1855 – 31 December 1909); married in 1875 Count Friedrich of Ysenburg and Büdingen in Meerholz (grandson of Ernst Casimir II, 2nd Prince of Ysenburg and Büdingen), no issue.

== Death and succession ==
Heinrich XX died on 8 November 1859 in Greiz, at the age of 65. He was succeeded by his eldest surviving son, Heinrich XXII.

== Ancestry ==
Ancestors of Heinrich XX, Prince Reuss of Greiz

8. Count Heinrich II Reuss of Obergreiz
4. Heinrich XI, Prince Reuss of Greiz
9. Countess Sophie Charlotte of Bothmer
2. Heinrich XIII, Prince Reuss of Greiz
10. Heinrich XXIV, Count Reuss of Köstritz
5. Countess Conradine Reuss of Köstritz
11. Baroness Marie Eleonore Emma of Promnitz-Dittersbach
1. Heinrich XX, Prince Reuss of Greiz
12. Charles August, Prince of Nassau-Weilburg
6. Charles Christian, Prince of Nassau-Weilburg
13. Princess Augusta of Nassau-Idstein
3. Princess Wilhelmine Louise of Nassau-Weilburg
14. William IV, Prince of Orange
7. Princess Carolina of Orange-Nassau
15. Anne, Princess Royal

== Notes and sources ==
- L'Allemagne dynastique, Huberty, Giraud, Magdelaine, Reference: I 333
- Gehrlein Thomas, The House of Reuss - Older and Younger line Börde Verlag 2006, ISBN 978-3-9810315-3-9

Heinrich XX, Prince Reuss of Greiz House Reuss of Greiz Cadet branch of the House of Reuss Born: 29 June 1794 Died: 8 November 1859
Regnal titles
Preceded by Heinrich XIX	Prince Reuss of Greiz; 1836 – 1859	Succeeded by Heinrich XXII
