= Princess Caroline of Hesse-Homburg (1819–1872) =

Caroline of Hesse-Homburg
- Princess Reuss of Greiz
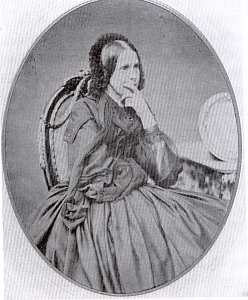
- Princess Caroline of Hesse-Homburg, Regent of Reuss-Greiz.
- Born: 19 March 1819; Bad Homburg vor der Höhe
- Died: 18 January 1872 (aged 52); Greiz
- Spouse: Henry XX, Prince Reuss of Greiz (m. 1839; died 1859)
- Issue: Christiane, Princess Hugo of Schönburg-Waldenburg; Prince Heinrich XXI; Heinrich XXII, Prince Reuss of Greiz; Prince Heinrich XXIII; Marie, Countess Friedrich of Ysenburg and Büdingen in Meerholz
- House: Hesse
- Father: Gustav, Landgrave of Hesse-Homburg
- Mother: Princess Louise of Anhalt-Dessau

Caroline of Hesse-Homburg (19 March 1819 – 18 January 1872) was a Princess consort of Reuss of Greiz by marriage to Henry XX, Prince Reuss of Greiz. She was the regent of the Principality of Reuss-Greiz during the minority of her minor son Heinrich XXII, Prince Reuss of Greiz, from 1859 until 1867.

== Life ==
Caroline was eldest child of Gustav, Landgrave of Hesse-Homburg, and his wife, Princess Louise of Anhalt-Dessau.

On 1 October 1839 in Homburg vor der Höhe, she married Henry XX, Prince Reuss of Greiz.

When her spouse died in 1859, she was made regent of the Principality during the minority of her son. When the Austro-Prussian War started in 1866, she chose the side of Austria, which was the reason to why the principality was occupied by Prussia, and she was forced to resign. At which point her son Heinrich XXII assumed full authority in 1867.

Caroline spent the rest of her life in Greiz, where she died of natural causes on 18 January 1872 at age 52.

== Marriage and issue ==
She had five children:

- Princess Hermine Reuss of Greiz (25 December 1840 – 4 January 1890), married in 1862 to Prince Hugo of Schönburg-Waldenburg, had issue.
- Prince Heinrich XXI Reuss of Greiz (11 February 1844 – 14 June 1844)
- Heinrich XXII, Prince Reuss of Greiz (28 March 1846 – 19 April 1902)
- Prince Heinrich XXIII Reuss of Greiz (27 June 1848 – 22 October 1861)
- Princess Marie Reuss of Greiz (19 March 1855 – 31 December 1909), married in 1875 to Count Friedrich of Ysenburg and Büdingen in Meerholz (grandson of Ernst Casimir II, 2nd Prince of Ysenburg and Büdingen), no issue.
