= Prince Christian of Hesse-Darmstadt =

German prince

Christian of Hesse-Darmstadt
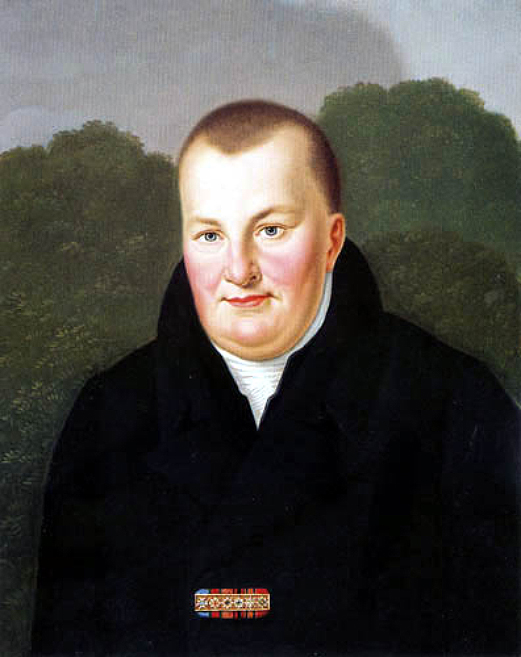
- Born: 25 November 1763; Bouxwiller
- Died: 17 April 1830 (aged 66); Darmstadt
- House: House of Hesse-Darmstadt
- Father: Louis IX, Landgrave of Hesse-Darmstadt
- Mother: Countess Palatine Caroline of Zweibrücken

Christian of Hessen-Darmstadt (25 November 1763, Bouxwiller – 17 April 1830, Darmstadt) was landgraf of the house of Hesse-Darmstadt and a Dutch general. He was also a keen Freemason, rising to grandmaster.

== Life ==
The youngest son of landgraf Louis IX and his wife Caroline, one of his brothers was grand-duke Louis I. Landgraf Christian studied in Strasbourg and then chose a military career in the service of the Dutch Republic. As lieutenant-general he fought for William V against the French from 1793 to 1794 and was badly wounded in the siege of Menen in April 1794. After the Dutch were defeated in 1795 he went into exile in England and later continued the war against France in the Austrian army. From 1799 he lived in Darmstadt, and is buried in the Alten Friedhof there.

== Ancestry ==
Ancestors of Prince Christian of Hesse-Darmstadt

8. Ernest Louis, Landgrave of Hesse-Darmstadt
4. Louis VIII, Landgrave of Hesse-Darmstadt
9. Dorothea Charlotte of Brandenburg-Ansbach
2. Louis IX, Landgrave of Hesse-Darmstadt
10. Johann Reinhard III of Hanau-Lichtenberg
5. Countess Charlotte of Hanau-Lichtenberg
11. Dorothea Friederike of Brandenburg-Ansbach
1. Landgrave Christian Hesse-Darmstadt
12. Christian II of Zweibrücken-Birkenfeld
6. Christian III, Count Palatine of Zweibrücken
13. Katharina Agathe of Rappoltstein
3. Countess Palatine Caroline of Zweibrücken
14. Louis Crato, Count of Nassau-Saarbrücken
7. Caroline of Nassau-Saarbrücken
15. Philippine Henriette of Hohenlohe-Langenburg
