= Heinrich XI, Prince Reuss of Greiz =

18th-century German noble

Heinrich XI
- Prince Reuss-Greiz
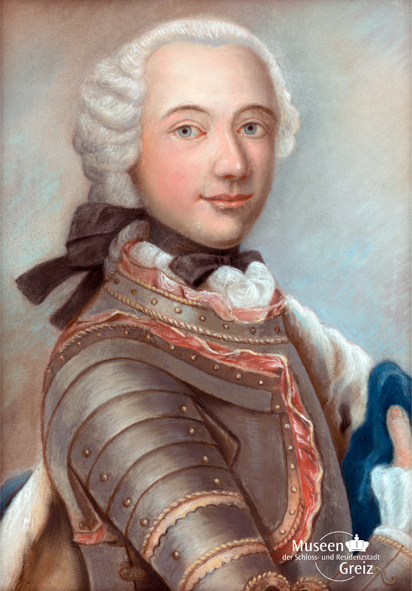
- Portrait of Heinrich XI, c. 1750
- Reign: 12 May 1778 – 28 June 1800; 17 March 1723 - 12 May 1778 (as count of Reuss-Obergreiz)
- Born: 18 March 1722; Greiz, Reuss
- Died: 28 June 1800 (aged 78); Greiz, Reuss Elder Line
- Spouse: Countess Conradine Reuss-Köstritz; Countess Alexandrine of Leiningen-Dagsburg-Heidesheim
- Issue: Count Heinrich XII; Countess Amalie; Heinrich XIII, Prince Reuss of Greiz; Friederike, Princess of Hohenlohe-Kirchberg; Prince Heinrich XIV; Prince Heinrich XV; Isabelle Auguste, Countess of Hachenburg; Countess Marie; Viktoria, Princess of Isenburg and Büdingen in Birstein; Count Heinrich XVI; Prince Heinrich XVII
- House: House Reuss of Greiz
- Father: Count Heinrich II Reuss-Obergreiz
- Mother: Countess Sophie Charlotte von Bothmer

Heinrich XI, Prince Reuss of Greiz (German: Heinrich XI Fürst Reuß zu Greiz; 18 March 1722 – 28 June 1800) was the first Prince Reuss of Greiz from 1778 to 1800. In 1723 he became count of Reuss-Obergreiz, his reign as count and Prince of 77 years is the third longest verified reign in Europe.

== Early life ==
Heinrich XI was born at Greiz, Reuss, youngest child of Count Heinrich II Reuss-Obergreiz, son of Heinrich VI, Count Reuss-Greiz and Baroness Henriette Amalie von Friesen, and his wife, Countess Sophie Charlotte von Bothmer, daughter of Count Hans Kaspar von Bothmer and Gisela Erdmuth von Hoym.

== Succession to Obergreiz and Untergreiz ==
Heinrich succeeded his brother Henry IX as Count of Reuss-Obergreiz 17 March 1723. After the death of Count Henry III Reuss-Untergreiz, in 1768, including the city of Untergreiz passed to the domains of the Heinrich XI and he was able to gather these possessions and guaranteed the line of succession.

== Prince Reuss of Greiz ==
On 12 May 1778 Heinrich was elevated to Prince of the Holy Roman Empire (German: Fürst) by the Holy Roman Emperor Joseph II. He received the Order of Saint Stephen of Hungary as well.

== First marriage and issue ==
Heinrich XI married on 4 April 1743 in Köstritz to Countess Conradine Reuss-Köstritz (1719–1770), youngest daughter of Heinrich XXIV, Count Reuss of Köstritz, and his wife, Baroness Marie Eleonore Emma von Promnitz-Dittersbach.

They had eleven children:

- Count Heinrich XII of Reuss-Greiz (25 April 1744 – 30 December 1745)
- Countess Amalie of Reuss-Greiz (25 October 1745 – 3 October 1748)
- Heinrich XIII, Prince Reuss-Greiz (16 February 1747 – 29 January 1817), married in 1786 to Princess Wilhelmine Louise of Nassau-Weilburg, had issue.
- Princess Friederike of Reuss-Greiz (9 July 1748 – 14 June 1816), married firstly in 1767 to Friedrich Ludwig, Count of Castell-Rüdenhausen, no issue, divorced in 1769; Married secondly in 1770 to Friedrich Wilhelm, Fürst zu Hohenlohe-Kirchberg, no issue.
- Prince Heinrich XIV of Reuss-Greiz (6 November 1749 – 12 February 1799), married morganatically in 1797 to Marie Anne Meyer, no issue.
- Prince Heinrich XV of Reuss-Greiz (22 February 1751 – 30 August 1825)
- Princess Isabelle Auguste of Reuss-Greiz (7 August 1752 – 10 October 1824), married in 1771 to Burgrave Wilhelm Georg of Kirchberg-Hachenburg, had issue, including Burgravine Louise Isabella of Kirchberg.
- Countess Marie of Reuss-Greiz (1 November 1754 – 28 September 1759)
- Princess Viktoria of Reuss-Greiz (20 January 1756 – 2 December 1819), married in 1783 to Wolfgang Ernst II, Prince of Isenburg und Büdingen zu Birstein, no issue.
- Count Heinrich XVI of Reuss-Greiz (30 August 1759 – 13 December 1763)
- Prince Heinrich XVII of Reuss-Greiz (25 May 1761 – 27 February 1807), married morganatically in 1805 to Babette von Wenz, issue: Isabelle von Wenz zum Lahnstein (1806-1886).

== Second marriage ==
Heinrich married secondly on 25 October 1770 in Frankfurt am Main to Countess Alexandrine of Leiningen-Dagsburg-Heidesheim (1732–1809), second daughter of Christian Karl Reinhard, Count of Leiningen-Dagsburg-Heidesheim, and his wife, Countess Catharine Polyxene of Solms-Rödelheim und Assenheim; they had no issue.

== Ancestry ==
Ancestors of Heinrich XI, Prince Reuss of Greiz

8. Heinrich I, Count Reuss-Greiz
4. Heinrich VI, Count Reuss-Greiz
9. Burgravine Sibylle Magdalene of Kirchberg
2. Count Heinrich II Reuss of Obergreiz
10. Baron Heinrich von Friesen the Younger
5. Baroness Henriette Amalie von Friesen
11. Maria Margaretha von Lützelburg
1. Heinrich XI, Prince Reuss of Greiz
12. Baron Julius August von Bothmer
6. Count Johann Kaspar von Bothmer
13. Margarethe Eleonore von Petersdorff
3. Countess Sophie Charlotte von Bothmer
14. Baron Ludwig Gebhard von Hoym
7. Gisela Erdmuth von Hoym
15. Sophie Katharina of Schönfeld

== Notes and sources ==
- Ancestors of Queen Juliana, Jaarboek Centraal Bureau Genealogie, Den Haag, Reference: 246
- L'Allemagne dynastique, Huberty, Giraud, Magdelaine, Reference: 309
- Les 256 quartiers genealogiques de Jacques Henri VI, chef de la maison de France, 1980., Vollet, Charles, Reference: 174

Heinrich XI, Prince Reuss of Greiz House Reuss of Greiz Cadet branch of the House of Reuss Born: 18 March 1722 Died: 28 June 1800
Regnal titles
New title	Prince Reuss of Greiz; 1778 – 1800	Succeeded by Heinrich XIII
