= Louis IX of Hesse-Darmstadt =

Louis IX
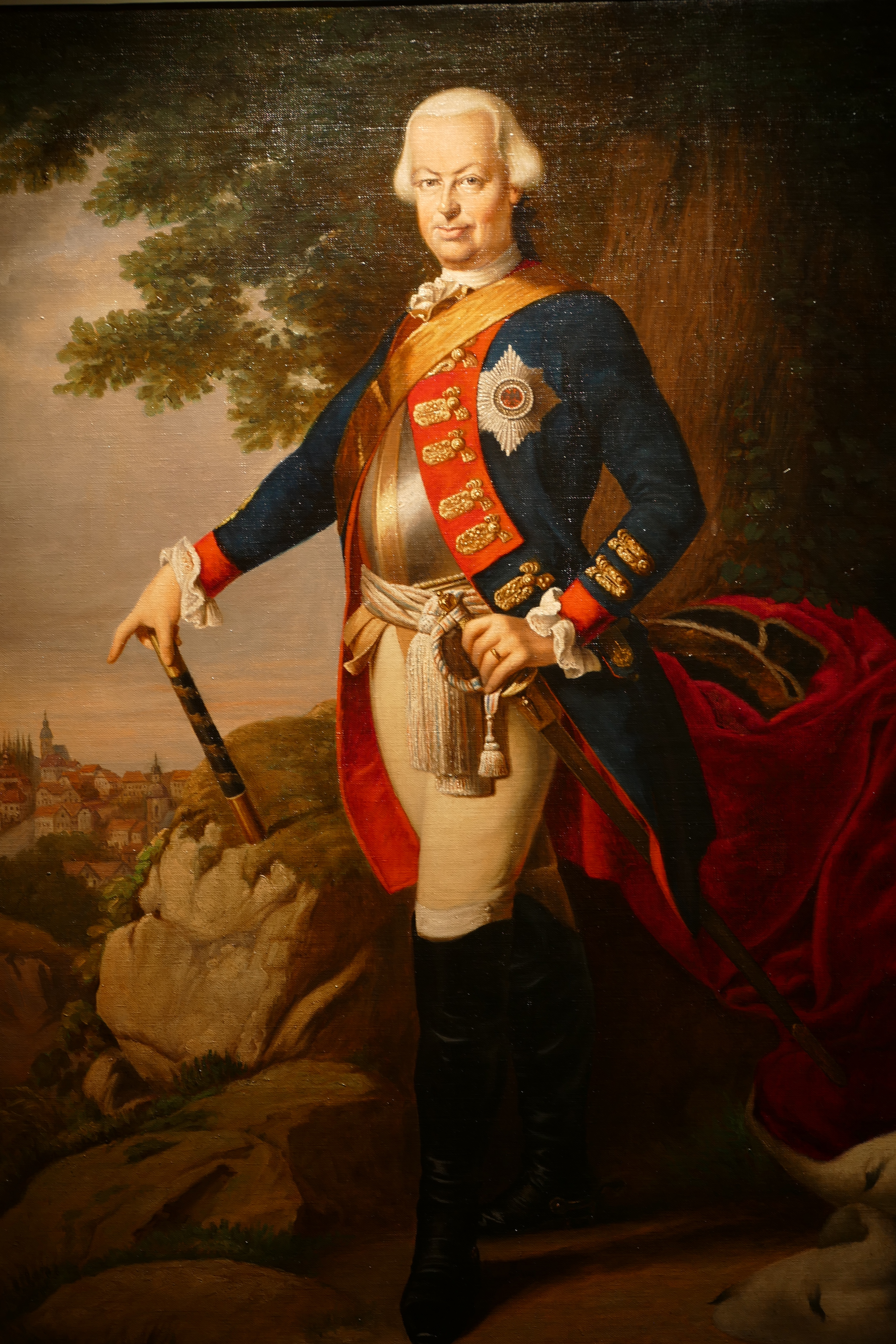

Landgrave of Hesse-Darmstadt
- Reign: 12 October 1768 – 6 April 1790
- Predecessor: Louis VIII
- Successor: Louis X
- Born: 15 December 1719; Darmstadt
- Died: 6 April 1790 (aged 70); Pirmasens
- Spouses: Countess Palatine Caroline of Zweibrücken (m. 1741; died 1774) Marie Adelaide of Cheirouze, Countess of Lemberg (m. 1775)
- Issue: Caroline, Landgravine of Hesse-Homburg; Frederica Louisa, Queen of Prussia; Louis I, Grand Duke of Hesse; Amalie, Hereditary Princess of Baden; Wilhelmina Louisa, Tsarevna of Russia; Louisa Augusta, Grand Duchess of Saxe-Weimar-Eisenach; Prince Frederick; Prince Christian
- House: Hesse-Darmstadt
- Father: Louis VIII, Landgrave of Hesse-Darmstadt
- Mother: Countess Charlotte of Hanau-Lichtenberg

Louis IX of Hesse-Darmstadt (German: Ludwig; 15 December 1719 – 6 April 1790) was Landgrave of Hesse-Darmstadt from 1768 to 1790.

After his military service in the army of Frederick the Great, Louis was involved in freemasonry and interested in theosophy and alchemy. He corresponded with Emanuel Swedenborg in 1771, as Swedonborg hoped that Louis would take over the leadership of Swedish Rite freemasonry in Germany.

As of 2026, Louis, along with his wife Caroline, are the most recent common ancestors of all currently reigning hereditary monarchs in Europe. The previous holder of this title was John William Friso, Prince of Orange.

== Early life ==
Louis IX was born in Darmstadt on 15 December 1719 to Louis VIII, Landgrave of Hesse-Darmstadt, and Charlotte of Hanau-Lichtenberg and Müntzenberg.

== Biography ==
His main residence was his palace in Pirmasens, Schloss Pirmasens.

== Personal life ==
On 12 August 1741, Louis married Caroline, daughter of Christian III, Duke of Zweibrücken. They had three sons and five daughters, including:

- Princess Caroline of Hesse-Darmstadt (1746–1821), married Frederick V, Landgrave of Hesse-Homburg
- Princess Frederica Louisa of Hesse-Darmstadt (1751–1805), married King Friedrich Wilhelm II of Prussia and became Queen of Prussia
- Prince Louis X (1753–1830), later Grand Duke Louis I, married his first cousin Princess Louise of Hesse-Darmstadt
- Princess Amalie of Hesse-Darmstadt (1754–1832), married her first cousin Karl Ludwig, Hereditary Prince of Baden
- Princess Wilhelmina Louisa of Hessen-Darmstadt (1755–1776), married Grand Duke Pavel Petrovich of Russia, later emperor
- Princess Luise Auguste of Hesse-Darmstadt (1757–1830), married Karl August, Grand Duke of Saxe-Weimar-Eisenach
- Prince Frederick (10 June 1759 – 11 March 1802) Never married and had no issue.
- Prince Christian of Hesse-Darmstadt (1763–1830)
- A stillborn son on 3 May 1742

In 1775, Louis IX married Marie Adelaide of Cheirouze, countess of Lemberg. On 6 April 1790, Louis died in Pirmasens.

Additionally Louis had an extramarital son with Ernestine Rosine Doll:

- Ernest Louis von Hessenzeig (10 November 1761 - 22 December 1774) Died young.

== Ancestry ==
Ancestors of Louis IX of Hesse-Darmstadt

Louis VI, Landgrave of Hesse-Darmstadt
Ernest Louis, Landgrave of Hesse-Darmstadt
Elisabeth Dorothea of Saxe-Gotha-Altenburg
Louis VIII, Landgrave of Hesse-Darmstadt
Albert II, Margrave of Brandenburg-Ansbach
Princess Dorothea Charlotte of Brandenburg-Ansbach
Sofie Margarete of Oettingen
Louis IX, Landgrave of Hesse-Darmstadt
Johann Reinhard II, Count of Hanau-Lichtenberg
Johann Reinhard III, Count of Hanau-Lichtenberg
Countess Palatine Anna Magdalena of Birkenfeld-Bischweiler
Countess Charlotte of Hanau-Lichtenberg
John Frederick, Margrave of Brandenburg-Ansbach
Princess Dorothea Friederike of Brandenburg-Ansbach
Johanna Elisabeth of Baden-Durlach (1651–1680)

== See also ==
- John William Friso and Marie Louise of Hesse-Kassel – Most recent common ancestors of all reigning hereditary European monarchs from the end of World War II until 2022
- Christian IX of Denmark and Louise of Hesse-Kassel – Common ancestors of many reigning hereditary European monarchs
  - Descendants of Christian IX of Denmark

Louis IX of Hesse-Darmstadt House of Hesse-Darmstadt Cadet branch of the House of Hesse Born: 15 December 1719 Died: 6 April 1790
Regnal titles
Preceded by Louis VIII	Landgrave of Hesse-Darmstadt; 1768–1790	Succeeded by Louis X as Grand Duke of Hesse and by Rhine
