= Hesse-Homburg =

Historical state in Germany

Landgraviate of Hesse-Homburg Landgrafschaft Hessen-Homburg
- 1622–1866
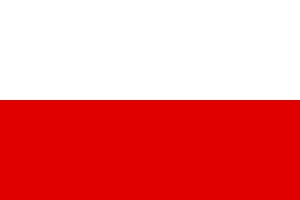
- Flag Coat of arms

- Map of Hesse-Homburg (two parts, beige, with Homburg and Meisenheim) and the Middle Rhine
- Status: State of the Holy Roman Empire; State of the German Confederation
- Capital: Homburg
- Common languages: German
- Religion: Protestantism
- Government: Absolute monarchy
- Landgrave of Hesse-Homburg
  - 1622–1638: Frederick I (first)
  - 1848–1866: Ferdinand (last)
- History
  - Established: 1622
  - Ceded by Darmstadt: 1668
  - Ceded to Darmstadt: 1806
  - Re-established: 1815
  - Inherited by Grand Duchy of Hesse^{1}: 1866

Area
  - Total: 430 km^{2} (170 sq mi)

Population
  - 1848: 22,800
Preceded by	Succeeded by
Landgraviate of Hesse-Darmstadt	Grand Duchy of Hesse; Province of Hesse-Nassau
- ^{1} Meisenheim ceded to the Prussian Rhine Province.

The Landgraviate of Hesse-Homburg was a state of the Holy Roman Empire and a sovereign member of the German Confederation, which consisted of the lordship of Homburg at the foot of the Taunus, which was then known as Die Höhe ("the Heights"). The reigning princes belonged to the Darmstadt line of the House of Hesse.

Hesse-Homburg was created in 1622 by the Landgrave of Hesse-Darmstadt to be ruled by one of his sons, but from 1622 to 1768 and again from 1806 to 1815, the territory was part of Hesse-Darmstadt. It was briefly divided into Hesse-Homburg and Hesse-Homburg-Bingenheim. But these parts were reunited in 1681. In 1815, it became a sovereign principality, expanded with the addition of Oberamt Meisenheim in the Rhineland to give a total area of 221 km². When the reigning princely family died out in March 1866, the territory returned to Hesse-Darmstadt, but the latter was forced to cede the territory to Prussia in September of the same year after it was defeated in the Austro-Prussian War.

== History ==
=== Holy Roman Empire (1622–1806) ===
The landgraves of Hesse-Homburg were a cadet branch of the Darmstadt branch of the House of Hesse, which existed from 1622 until 1866. Hesse-Darmstadt, like many principalities, was theoretically inherited through primogeniture. However, in practice, the younger sons were often endowed with a piece of land. Thus, the first landgrave of Hesse-Homburg, Frederick I (1585-1638), the youngest son of George I, Landgrave of Hesse-Darmstadt (1547-1609), received the territory of Homburg in 1622, after his brother Louis V, Landgrave of Hesse-Darmstadt had fallen significantly behind with his appanage payments. Frederick I received the city and amt of Homburg before the heights "with all prestige and authority" but "without princely power" and allowed to draw his appanage payments from the incomes of Homburg. The treaty governing this was concluded on 6 March 1622 and Homburg was handed over to Frederick on 23 July 1622. The landgraves thus remained subordinate to the Landgrave of Hesse-Darmstadt under Imperial law, owing it homage, for example. Darmstadt was obliged to pay Homburg 15,000 gulder annually, but generally did not manage to do so. The law of the time did not clearly distinguish between princely authority and a simple transfer of territory for economic purposes. Thus, Hesse-Homburg early began to seek independence. It succeeded in 1768, when a dynastic treaty was agreed, known as the Vergleichspunktuation, in which Hesse-Darmstadt waived its sovereignty over Hesse-Homburg. In this treaty, the territory received wide-ranging internal sovereignty, but whether Hesse-Homburg thereafter possessed Imperial immediacy is doubted by the historian Barbara Dölemeyer, among others: "Hesse-Darmstadt reserved for itself only the relationship with the Emperor and Empire; it represented Hesse-Homburg in the Reichstag and in the assembly of the Imperial circle and paid the Imperial and circle taxes for Homburg. Hesse-Homburg thus never possessed Imperial immediacy... Therefore, the incorporation of Homburg into... Hesse-Darmstadt between 1806 and 1816 can... probably not be called 'mediatization'."

Landgrave Frederick II (1633-1708), the prince of Homburg "with the silver leg," was notable as a Swedish and Brandenburger general, who followed a mercantalist economic policy and carried out numerous developmental projects, based on his experiences in the service of Brandenburg. These included the settlement of Huguenot colonists at Friedrichsdorf. The resulting economic prosperity is evidenced by the early Baroque Bad Homburg Castle.

It is notable that five landgraves (Frederick VI, Louis, Philip, Gustave, and Ferdinand) were members of the Military Order of Maria Theresa.

At the end of the Holy Roman Empire, Hesse-Homburg consisted of the settlements of Dillingen, Dornholzhausen, Espa, Langgöns, Friedrichsdorf, Gonzenheim, Homburg, Köppern, Oberstedten, Seulberg and half of Petterweil. By a treaty signed on 26 April 1803, an exchange of territory between Hesse-Homburg and Nassau-Usingen was agreed, which granted the village of Kirdorf to Hesse-Homburg, in exchange for Espa, which had been acquired by Hesse-Homburg in 1785.

=== German Confederation (1815-1866) ===
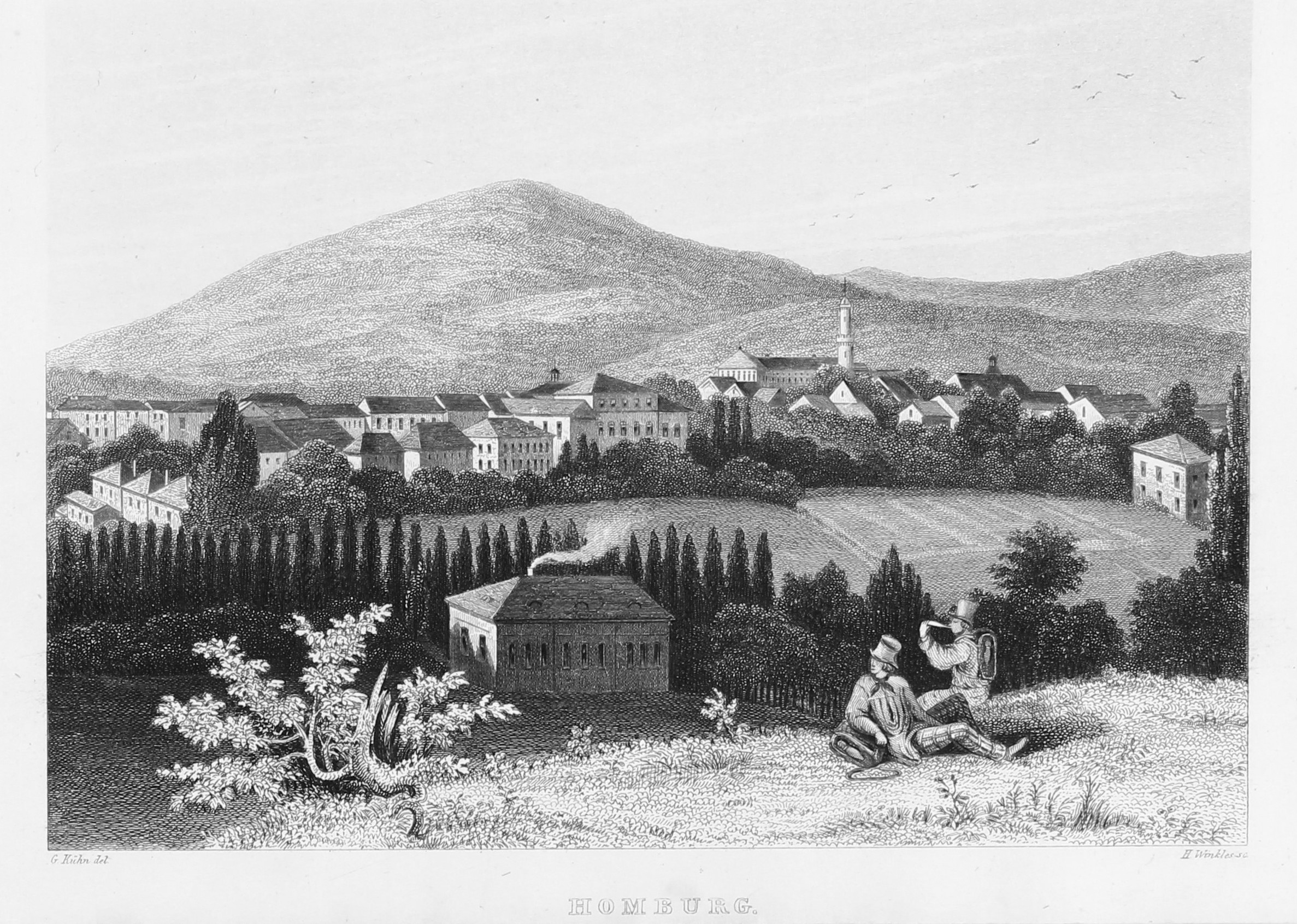
Homburg in 1851

Frederick V lost his lands in the German mediatisation of 1806, when Hesse-Homburg was incorporated into the Grand Duchy of Hesse (Hesse-Darmstadt). But in 1815, the Congress of Vienna forced Hesse-Darmstadt to recognize the independence of Hesse-Homburg, which was increased by the addition of Meisenheim (176 km²), part of the former French département of Sarre, located on the left side of the Rhine some 80 km southwest of Homburg.

Hesse-Homburg joined the German Confederation as a sovereign state on 7 July 1817. In 1848, the landgraviate had a population of 22,800 and a total land area of 430 km², thus making it one of the smallest states in the German Confederation. The landgraviate was the only principality that was not one of the founding members of the Confederation, apart from the Duchy of Limburg ruled by the King of the Netherlands (added in 1839) and the Duchy of Schleswig (1848-1851) ruled by the Danish king. The landgraviate supplied the Homburg Scouts battalion in the Federal Army of the new Confederation. This battalion was stationed at the Jägerkaserne in Bad Homburg. Hesse-Homburg was represented by the Grand Duchy of Hesse in the Inner Council of the Confederate Diet, but had a seat of its own on the Plenary Council.

In 1833, baths were opened in Homburg, which brought unexpected wealth and attention to the landgraviate. A casino and gambling saloons soon opened, which also contributed greatly to the state's burgeoning economy. Several legal overtures were made by the diet in an attempt to end gambling, but all attempts failed until after Hesse-Homburg passed into Prussian hands. Hesse-Homburg joined the Central German Commercial Union in 1828, but Meisenheim became part of the Prussian customs area in 1830 and the Prussian-led Zollverein in 1834. In 1836, when the Hessian customs system was merged with the Zollverein, Homburg followed it into the Zollverein. On 8 December 1837, Hesse-Homburg joined the South German monetary convention, which had been formed in Munich on 25 August 1837. On 20 November 1838, it also coined the monetary convention that was formed at Dresden on 20 July 1838. In accordance with these conventions, the landgraves Louis William and Philip minted coins worth 1/2, 1, and 2 gulders and coins worth 1, 3 and 6 kreuzer. On 24 January 1857, Hesse-Homburg also joined the Vienna monetary convention. Between 1858 and 1863, Hesse-Homburg minted 38,000 Vereinsthaler. In 1848, the issuing of bank notes was discussed in Hesse-Homburg, but the plan was not executed. From 1855, the Homburger Bank was Hesse-Homburg's private note bank, which issued bank notes until 1876.

Despite the provisions of article 13 of the Constitution of the German Confederation, Hesse-Homburg had no constitution until 3 January 1850, when Landgrave Gustav issued a constitution in response to the March Revolution. A landtag was elected in 1848, but it had no significant power. On 20 April 1852, the landgrave rescinded the constitution.

With the death of Landgrave Ferdinand on 24 March 1866, the Hesse-Homburg dynasty's male line came to an end. Hesse-Homburg returned to the Grand Duke of Hesse, while Meisenheim fell to Prussia. In the peace treaty which concluded the Austro-Prussian War later that same year, Prussia took the other territories of Hesse-Homburg from Hesse-Darmstadt again. The former landgraviate was combined with the Electorate of Hesse, Duchy of Nassau, the Free City of Frankfurt and some former parts of the Kingdom of Bavaria to form the Prussian Province of Hesse-Nassau. Meisenheim became part of Prussia's Rhine Province.

Today, the former Homburg district forms part of the German state of Hesse while Meisenheim forms part of Rhineland-Palatinate.

==== Government and administration ====
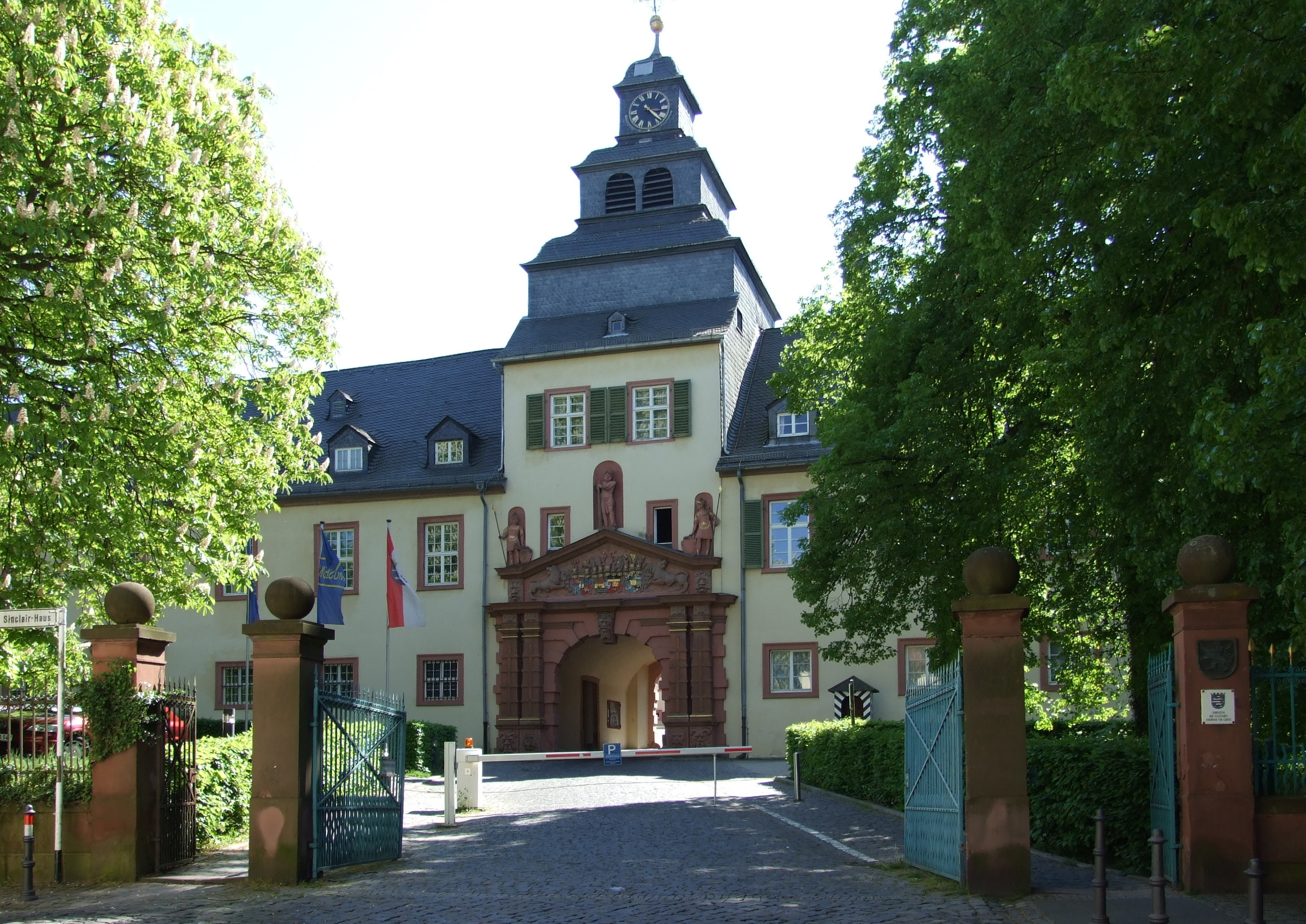
Entrance to Homburg Castle.

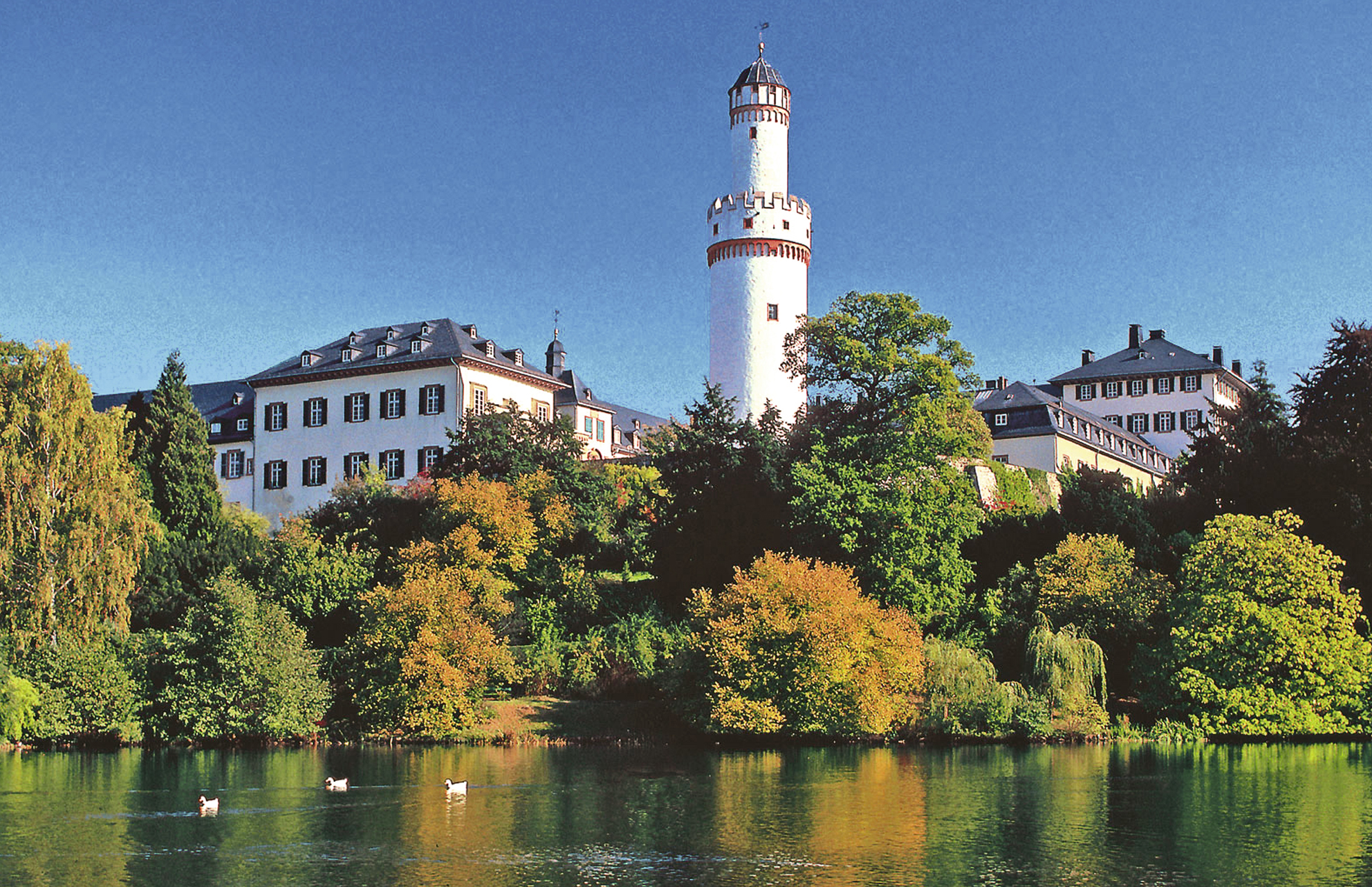
Homburg Castle

The landgraviate was an absolute monarchy, headed by the landgrave, who was simultaneously head of government and head of administration. All decisions about laws and ordinances were made by the landgrave.

The most important administrative body in Hesse-Homburg was the Privy Council (Geheimrat), which was created by an ordinance of 12 May 1816. It had wide powers, including dynastic affairs, foreign affairs, the direction of internal affairs, oversight of local government, judicial appeals, acts of clemency, and the landgrave's personal affairs.

The landgrave presided over the Council and appointed its members. It had only an advisory function. The directors of the Privy Council were the highest-ranking civil servants in the landgravate. They were responsible for preparation and passage of matters reserved to the central government, as well as countersigning laws and ordinances. The following individuals held the role.

- 1817–1818: Karl von Zyllnhardt, Director of the Privy Council and President
- 1820–1827: Johann Philipp von Hert, Director of the Privy Council and President of all state colleges
- 1828–1832: Carl Friedrich Emil von Ibell, Director of the Privy Council and President of all state colleges
- 1832–1841: Vacant
- 1841–1847: Karl Bernhard von Ibell, Director of the Privy Council
- (1847–1848): Ludwig Karl Wilhelm Henrich, provisional director of government
- 1848–1862: Dr. jur. Christian Bansa
- 1862–1866: Georg Ferdinand Fenner, Director of the Privy Council

On 18 February 1818, Frederick V founded the State Government, which combined all formerly independent state colleges (consistories, chamber, forestry college, college medicum, and court) into a central authority, divided into three deputations:

- I. Justice (Civil and criminal law, as well as marital and disciplinary matters of the former consistories)
- II. State administration, police, health, poor aid, oversight of trusts, postal service, churches, schools, etc.
- III. Finance and cameral administration, including administration of domains and forests.

Hesse-Homburg had no constitution except from a brief period between 1850 and 1852.

== See also ==
- House of Hesse-Homburg
- Rulers of Hesse
