= House of Arnstein =

Noble family from the Saxony-Anhalt region in Germany

Arnstein
- Country: Saxony-Anhalt, Germany
- Founded: 12th century
- Founder: Walter I, Count of Arnstein
- Final ruler: Luitgard, Countess of Arnstein (main line); Wichmann, Count of Lindow-Ruppin (Lindow-Ruppin line); August Louis, Count of Barby-Mühlingen (Barby-Mühlingen line)
- Titles: Count
- Estate: Burg Arnstein
- Deposition: 1296/1332 (main line); 1524 (Lindow-Ruppin line); 1659 (Barby-Mühlingen line)
- Cadet branches: Lindow-Ruppin line Barby-Mühlingen line

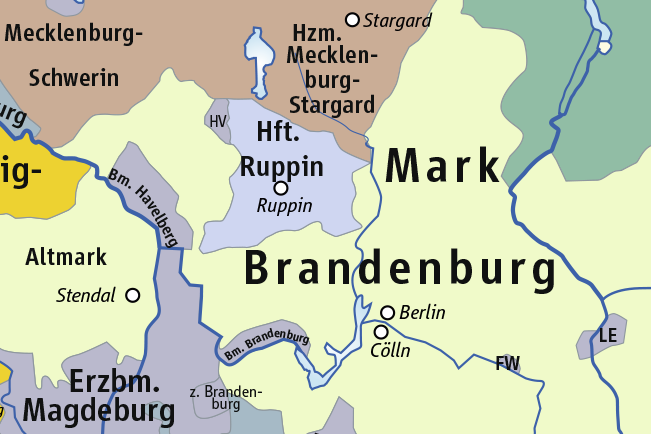
The map of the County of Lindow-Ruppin in 1400

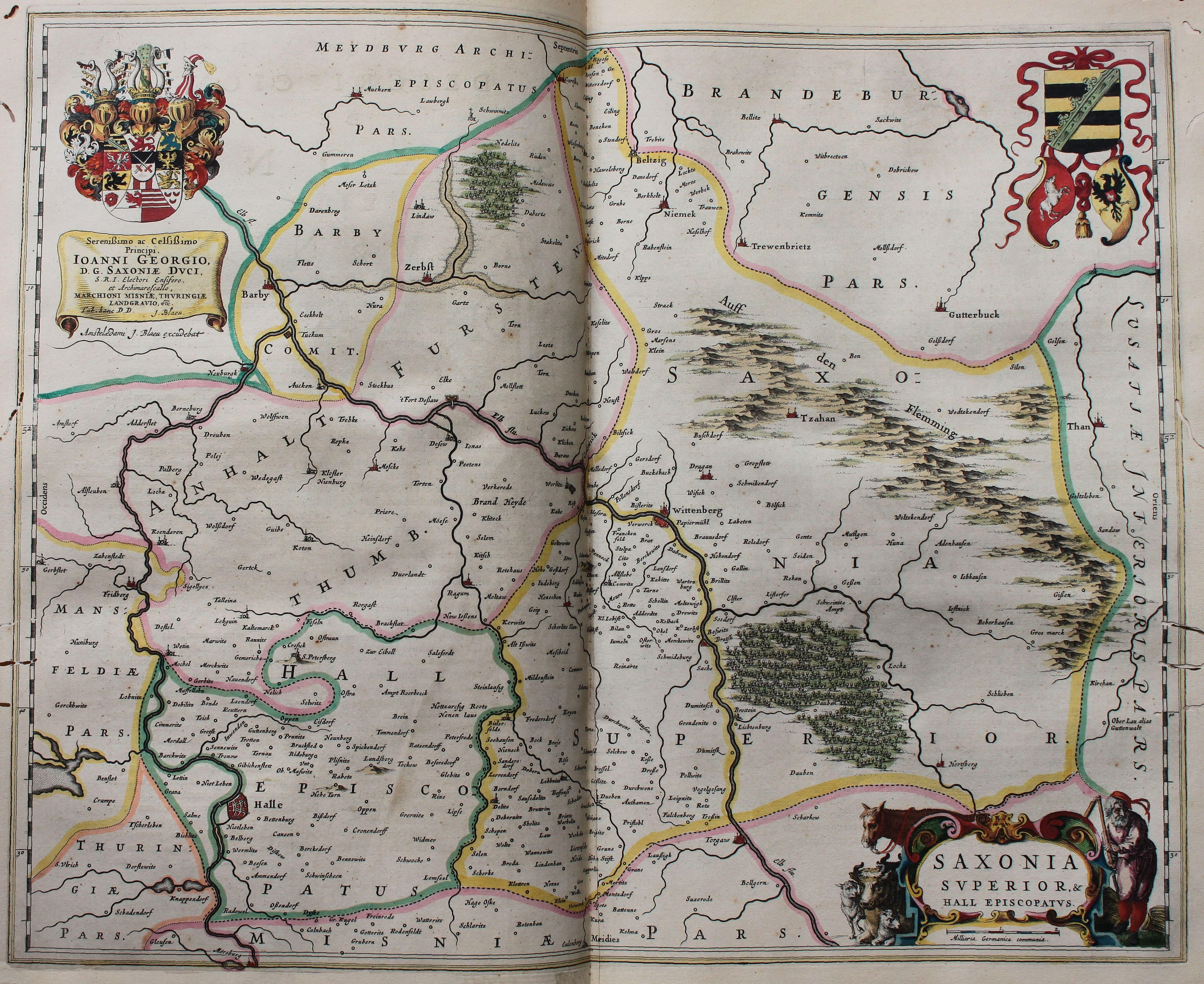
The map of the County of Barby, Geographia Blaviana in 1659

The House of Arnstein was an ancient German noble family from the Saxony-Anhalt region. Different lines of the family ruled the County of Arnstein, the County of Ruppin and the County of Barby-Mühlingen.

== History ==
The Lords (or Counts) of Arnstein descended from the Swabian von Steusslingen family; their first known member was Walter of Steusslingen (died 1056). Walter was the father of Adalbero, who was in turn father of Werner, Bishop of Münster, and also of Walter I, the first lord of Arnstein in Saxony. Their family name was originally spelled Arnstedt, but were later called Arnstein, this last name possibly deriving from the castle they owned, or the land they ruled.

=== Arnstein Castle and land ===
In 1135 they moved to Saxony and built their first known residence: Arnstein Castle, near Aschersleben on the Eastern Harz river. The use of the title Count of Arnstein goes back to the end of the 12th century. In 1289, Walter von Arnstein was burgrave of Freckleben.

The Arnstein dynasty owned land in Mühlingen, in the County of Mansfeld, in the Archbishopric of Magdeburg and in Quedlinburg Abbey (of which they were sub-bailiffs). The Counts of Mühlingen and probably also the Counts of Falkenstein are said to have descended from the family.

== Feudal divisions of Arnstein ==
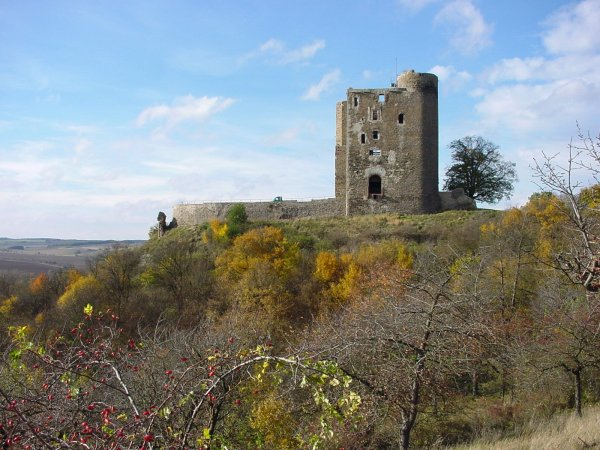
Arnstein castle

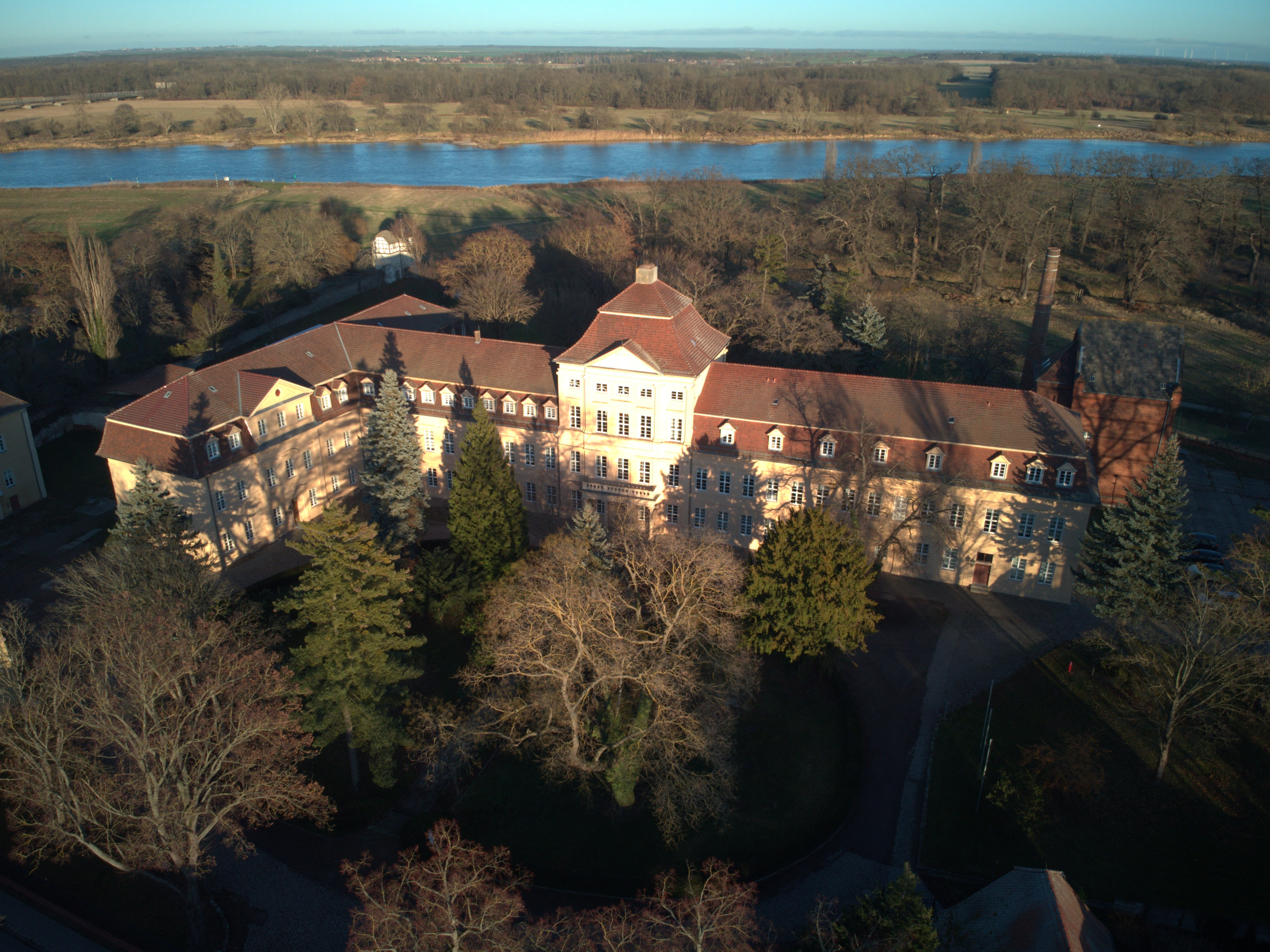
Barby castle

In 1196, the three children of Walter III (1150–1196) and his wife Gertrude of Ballenstedt (granddaughter of Albert the Bear) divided their patrimony:

- Albert I inherited the main county of Arnstein. This main line went extinct after the abdication, in 1292, of the two brothers who were co-ruling at the time; both joined the Teutonic Order. Their possessions were eventually inherited to the noble lords of Schraplau, the princes of Anhalt, the counts of Mansfeld and the Archbishopric of Magdeburg. Johann Siebmacher places the end of the family at the beginning of the 14th century, with Günther von Arnstein's death in 1321
- Gebhard inherited the County of Lindow-Ruppin, which went on to make powerful alliances with eastern German lords as the House of Nikloting of Mecklenburg of the House of Griffins from Pomerania, or even the main Electorate of Saxony. The family eventually survived until 1524, when the last member, Wichmann, died with no descendants. The county was inherited by Brandenburg. A relative of Wichmann sued the Imperial Chamber Court against the seizure of the lordship in 1541, but the case was dismissed in 1562.
- Walter IV inherited the Lordship of Barby-Mühlingen, which oriented its alliances to the Anhalt region and, like Lindow-Ruppin, to the main Electorate of Saxony. The count itself, in 1494, stretched from Mühlingen in the west, Walternienburg in the east, Rosenburg in the south and Zackmünde in the north. The lordship was elevated to a county in 1497, and achieved, in the same year, Imperial immediacy.

This line was the last to be extinct. After the death of August Louis in 1659, the family's main possessions were inherited by Saxe-Weissenfels and Anhalt-Zerbst.

== Coats of arms ==
The coat of arms of the main line of the family shows a silver, gold-armored eagle in black or red.

- The branch of Lindow-Ruppin replicates the main line's design, with a silver eagle in red.
- The branch of Barby-Muhlingen adopts a more different version: in its first and fourth quarters, the family adopts a red eagle in silver; in the second and third ones, it can be seen a silver flower with a golden center in red.
Coat of arms of the main branch of the family.

Coat of arms of the Lindow-Ruppin branch.

Coat of arms of the Barby-Mühlingen branch.

== Rulers of Arnstein and its successor states ==
=== House of Arnstein ===
Partitions of Arnstein under Arnstein rule

==== Partitions of Arnstein under Arnstein rule ====
Lordship of Lindow-Ruppin (1196–1524)	Lordship of Arnstein (1107–1296)	Lordship of Barby-Mühlingen (1196–1497); Raised to: County of Barby-Mühlingen (1497–1659)
Lordship of Lindow-Ruppin (1196–1524)	Annexed to Falkenstein	Lordship of Barby-Mühlingen (1196–1497); Raised to: County of Barby-Mühlingen (1497–1659)
Annexed to Brandenburg	Annexed to Falkenstein	Lordship of Barby-Mühlingen (1196–1497); Raised to: County of Barby-Mühlingen (1497–1659)
Annexed to Brandenburg	Annexed to Falkenstein	Annexed to Saxe-Weissenfels and Anhalt

Table of rulers

(Note: The rulers in the table follow a single counting (as costumary in sources that call Albert X to the count of Barby who died in 1588), in spite of the different parts from where they ruled. This is not, however, a unanimous point of view; some authors choose to individualize the numberings according to the part; that's why, for example, Albert VII of Barby can be also called by some as Albert III).

Ruler	Born	Reign	Ruling part	Consort	Death	Notes
Walter I	c.1060? Son of Adalbero of Steusslingen and Judith	c.1090 – 16 February 1126	County of Arnstein	Unknown at least one child	16 February 1126; Kulm aged 65–66?	Probably the founder of the family.
Walter II	c.1110? Son of Walter I	16 February 1126 – 18 April 1176	County of Arnstein	Irmgard of Plotzkau (d.1 September 1161) at least one child	18 April 1176 aged 65–66?	
Walter III	c.1140? Son of Walter II and Irmgard of Plotzkau	18 April 1176 – 1196	County of Arnstein	Gertrude of Ballenstedt (d.1194) seven children	1196 aged 55–56?	
Albert I	c.1180? First son of Walter III and Gertrude of Ballenstedt	1196 – 1240	County of Arnstein	Matilda of Blankenburg-Regenstein (d.1267) seven children	1240 aged 59–60?	Sons of Walter III, divided their inheritance.
Gebhard	c.1180? Second son of Walter III and Gertrude of Ballenstedt	1196 – 9 March 1256	Lordship of Lindow-Ruppin	Hedwig of Hirscher-Siebenburgen (1225–1271); 1211 three children	9 March 1256 aged 75–76?	Sons of Walter III, divided their inheritance.
Walter IV	c.1180? Third son of Walter III and Gertrude of Ballenstedt	18 April 1176 – 1259	Lordship of Barby-Mühlingen	Luitgard of Querfurt-Magdeburg (d.6 May 1293) seven children	c.1255 aged 74–75?	Sons of Walter III, divided their inheritance.
Walter V	1219; Son of Albert I and Matilda of Blankenburg-Regenstein	1240 – 27 October 1268	County of Arnstein	Margaret of Kranichfeld (d.1290) three children	27 October 1268 aged 48–49	
Günther I	1212; First son of Gebhard and Hedwig of Hirscher-Siebenburgen	9 March 1256 – 1284	Lordship of Lindow-Ruppin	Euphemia of Rügen (1216-?) three children	1284 aged 71–72	Children of Gebhard, ruled jointly.
Walter VI	c.1215? Second son of Gebhard and Hedwig of Hirscher-Siebenburgen	9 March 1256 – 1279	Lordship of Lindow-Ruppin	Unmarried	1279 aged 63–64?	Children of Gebhard, ruled jointly.
Walter VII	c.1220? First son of Walter IV and Luitgard of Querfurt-Magdeburg	1259 – 1271	Lordship of Barby-Mühlingen	Unknown three children	1271 aged 50–51?	Children of Walter IV, ruled jointly.
Burkhard I	c.1220? Second son of Walter IV and Luitgard of Querfurt-Magdeburg	1259 – 6 November 1285	Lordship of Barby-Mühlingen	Unmarried	6 November 1285 aged 64–65?	Children of Walter IV, ruled jointly.
Burkhard II	c.1220? Third son of Walter IV and Luitgard of Querfurt-Magdeburg	1259 – 24 November 1271	Lordship of Barby-Mühlingen	Sophia of Woldenburg four children	24 November 1271 aged 50–51?	Children of Walter IV, ruled jointly.
Walter VIII	c.1220? Fourth son of Walter IV and Luitgard of Querfurt-Magdeburg	1259 – 1285	Lordship of Barby-Mühlingen	Luitgard of Werberg (d.23 October ?) no children	1285 aged 64–65?	Children of Walter IV, ruled jointly.
Albert II	1240; Son of Walter V and Margaret of Kranichfeld	27 October 1268 – 1279	County of Arnstein	Matilda of Mansfeld-Querfurt (1235–1289) seven children	1279 aged 38–39	
Walter IX	c.1260? First son of Albert IIand Matilda of Mansfeld-Querfurt	1279 – 1296	County of Arnstein	Unmarried	1310 aged 49–50?	Children of Albert II, ruled jointly. In 1296, Walter abdicated to join the Teutonic Order.
Albert III	c.1260? Second son of Albert IIand Matilda of Mansfeld-Querfurt	1279 – 1284	County of Arnstein	Unmarried	1284 aged 23–24?	Children of Albert II, ruled jointly. In 1296, Walter abdicated to join the Teutonic Order.
Ulrich I	1260; First son of Günther I and Euphemia of Rügen	1284 – 1316	Lordship of Lindow-Ruppin	Adelaide of Schladen (d.1322) four children	1316 aged 55–56	Children of Günther I, ruled jointly.
Burkhard IV	c.1260 Second son of Günther I and Euphemia of Rügen	1284 – 1311	Lordship of Lindow-Ruppin	Elisabeth of Holstein (d.1318) c.1305 three children	1311 aged 50–51	Children of Günther I, ruled jointly.
Albert IV	c.1250? Son of Walter VII	6 November 1285 – 1312	Lordship of Barby-Mühlingen	Luitgard of Hohnstein (d.1279) four children	1312 aged 50–51?	Cousins, ruled jointly.
Burkhard III	c.1250? First son of Burkhard II and Sophia of Woldenburg	6 Novembre 1285 – 10 December 1308	Lordship of Barby-Mühlingen	Clementia of Dassel-Ninofer (d.1321) four children	10 DEcember 1308 aged 34–35?	Cousins, ruled jointly.
Walter X	c.1250? Second son of Burkhard II and Sophia of Woldenburg	6 November 1285 – 19 September 1313	Lordship of Barby-Mühlingen	Elisabeth of Henneberg-Coburg (1291–1307); 1303; Coburg no children	19 September 1313 aged 50–51?	Cousins, ruled jointly.
Luitgard	c.1260? Daughter of Albert IIand Matilda of Mansfeld-Querfurt	1296 – 1332	County of Arnstein	Otto IV, Count of Falkenstein (d.1328); 29 June 1281 six children	1332 aged 71–72?	Through her marriage, her inheritance fell to the House of Falkenstein.
Arnstein annexed to Falkenstein
Albert V the Elder	1271; Son of Albert IV and Luitgard of Hohnstein	19 September 1313 – August 1332	Lordship of Barby-Mühlingen	Judith of Schwarzburg-Blankenburg (1306-11 September 1352) four children	18 July or August 1332 aged 61–62	
Ulrich II	1315; First son of Ulrich I and Adelaide of Schladen	1316 – 3 February 1356	Lordship of Lindow-Ruppin	Agnes of Anhalt-Zerbst (d.1352); 1324 five children	3 February 1356 aged 40–41	Children of Ulrich I, ruled jointly. It's possible that Burkhard IV's son, Burkhard, ascended with his cousins as Burkhard V, and then abdicated when he became Bishop of Havelberg. Proving this is the fact that, as Bishop, he was still titled Count of Lindow-Ruppin, which opens the possibility that he kept the co-rulership even after becoming Bishop.
Günther II	c.1315? Second son of Ulrich I and Adelaide of Schladen	1316 – 1343	Lordship of Lindow-Ruppin	Luitgard of Mecklenburg; 1318 no children	1343 aged 27–28?	Children of Ulrich I, ruled jointly. It's possible that Burkhard IV's son, Burkhard, ascended with his cousins as Burkhard V, and then abdicated when he became Bishop of Havelberg. Proving this is the fact that, as Bishop, he was still titled Count of Lindow-Ruppin, which opens the possibility that he kept the co-rulership even after becoming Bishop.
Burkhard V	c.1310? Son of Burkhard IV and Elisabeth of Holstein	1316 – 1348	Lordship of Lindow-Ruppin	Unmarried	30 January 1370 aged 59–60?	Children of Ulrich I, ruled jointly. It's possible that Burkhard IV's son, Burkhard, ascended with his cousins as Burkhard V, and then abdicated when he became Bishop of Havelberg. Proving this is the fact that, as Bishop, he was still titled Count of Lindow-Ruppin, which opens the possibility that he kept the co-rulership even after becoming Bishop.
Albert VII	20 January 1320; First son of Albert V and Judith of Schwarzburg-Blankenburg	August 1332 – 16 February 1358	Lordship of Barby-Mühlingen	Judith of Anhalt-Zerbst (d.11 September 1352) four children	16 February 1358 aged 38	Children of Albert V, ruled jointly.
Günther IV	c.1320? Second son of Albert V and Judith of Schwarzburg-Blankenburg	August 1332 – 18 August 1404	Lordship of Barby-Mühlingen	Constance (d.25 April 1372) two children Dorothea of Gleichen (d.13 December 1385); 4 August 1393 one child	18 August 1404 aged 83–84?	Children of Albert V, ruled jointly.
Albert VI	1330; First son of Ulrich II and Agnes of Anhalt-Zerbst	3 February 1356 – 29 April 1391	Lordship of Lindow-Ruppin	Sophia of Werle-Goldberg (1333–1384); 1324 five children	29 April 1391 aged 60–61	Children of Ulrich I, ruled jointly.
Ulrich III	c.1330? Second son of Ulrich I and Adelaide of Schladen	3 February 1356 – 2 April 1359	Lordship of Lindow-Ruppin	Unmarried	2 April 1359 aged 28–29?	Children of Ulrich I, ruled jointly.
Günther III	c.1330? Third son of Ulrich I and Adelaide of Schladen	3 February 1356 – 1356	Lordship of Lindow-Ruppin	Unmarried	1356 aged 25–26?	Children of Ulrich I, ruled jointly.
Valdemar	c.1330? Fourth son of Ulrich I and Adelaide of Schladen	3 February 1356 – 1358	Lordship of Lindow-Ruppin	Unmarried	1358 aged 27–28?	Children of Ulrich I, ruled jointly.
Günther V	c.1370? First son of Albert VI and Sophia of Werle-Goldberg	29 April 1391 – 7 September 1416	Lordship of Lindow-Ruppin	Cordula of Wernigerode (1386-11 September 1419) one child	7 September 1416 aged 45–46?	Children of Albert VI, ruled jointly.
Ulrich IV	c.1370? Second son of Albert VI and Sophia of Werle-Goldberg	29 April 1391 – c.1400?	Lordship of Lindow-Ruppin	Unmarried	c.1400? aged 29–30?	Children of Albert VI, ruled jointly.
John I	c.1370? Third son of Albert VI and Sophia of Werle-Goldberg	29 April 1391 – c.1400?	Lordship of Lindow-Ruppin	Unmarried	c.1400? aged 29–30?	Children of Albert VI, ruled jointly.
John II	c.1380 Son of Günther IV and Constance	18 August 1404 – 1407	Lordship of Barby-Mühlingen	Judith of Anhalt-Zerbst (d.11 September 1352) four children	1407 aged 38	Children of Günther IV, ruled jointly.
Burkhard VI	c.1395 Second son of Günther IV and Dorothea of Gleichen	18 August 1404 – 1 April 1420	Lordship of Barby-Mühlingen	Sophia of Anhalt-Zerbst (d.1419); 1415 one child	1 April 1420 near Magdeburg aged 24–25	Children of Günther IV, ruled jointly.
Regency of Cordula of Wernigerode (1416-1420)						
Albert VIII	1406; Son of Günther V and Cordula of Wernigerode	7 September 1416 – June 1460	Lordship of Lindow-Ruppin	Catharina of Lubin (1400-11 JUne 1424); 1 August 1423 no children Anna of Zagan (1408-4 November 1437); 1424/34 five children Margaret of Pomerania-Stettin; 26 May 1439 one child	June 1460 aged 53–54	
Regency of George I, Prince of Anhalt-Dessau (1420-1435)						Ascended as a minor. From 1460, he associated his sons in co-rulership.
Günther VI	1417; Son of Burkhard VIand Sophia of Anhalt-Zerbst	1 April 1420 – 19 November 1493	Lordship of Barby-Mühlingen	Catharina of Regenstein-Blankenburg (d.20 January 1455); 1441 five children Sophia of Anhalt-Köthen (c.1420-after 1470) c.1455 seven children	19 November 1493 aged 75–76	Ascended as a minor. From 1460, he associated his sons in co-rulership.
John IV	1444; Second son of Günther VI and Catharina of Regenstein-Blankenburg	1460 – 1481	Lordship of Barby-Mühlingen	Unmarried	1481; Vienna aged 36–37	Ascended as a minor. From 1460, he associated his sons in co-rulership.
Albert IX	1446; Third son of Günther VI and Catharina of Regenstein-Blankenburg	1460 – 7 November 1481	Lordship of Barby-Mühlingen	Unmarried	7 November 1481 aged 34–35	Ascended as a minor. From 1460, he associated his sons in co-rulership.
Jacob	c.1440? First son of Albert VIII and Anna of Zagan	June 1460 – 1 May 1499	Lordship of Lindow-Ruppin	Anna of Stolberg (21 August 1458 – 26 October 1526) no children	7 September 1416 aged 45–46?	Children of Albert VIII, ruled jointly.
John III	c.1445? Second son of Albert VIII and Anna of Zagan	June 1460 – 14 June 1500	Lordship of Lindow-Ruppin	Ursula of Barby-Mühlingen (1457–1484); 1472 two children Anna of Saxe-Lauenburg (d. 9 August 1504); February 1490 no children	14 June 1500 aged 54–55?	Children of Albert VIII, ruled jointly.
Burkhard VIII	1442; First son of Günther VI and Catharina of Regenstein-Blankenburg	19 November 1493 – 3 November 1505	Lordship of Barby-Mühlingen (until 1497) County of Barby-Mühlingen (from 1497)	Magdalena of Mecklenburg-Stargard; 14 July 1482 twelve children	3 November 1505 aged 75–76	Ruled with his father and brothers probably since c.1460.
Joachim	1474; Son of John III and Ursula of Barby-Mühlingen	14 June 1500 – 14 February 1507	Lordship of Lindow-Ruppin	Margaret of Hohnstein (d.15 October 1508) one child	14 February 1507 aged 26–27	
Jobst I	1484; First son of Burkhard Vand Magdalena of Mecklenburg-Stargard	3 November 1505 –3 December 1515	County of Barby-Mühlingen	Unmarried	3 December 1515 aged 30–31	Children of Burkhard V, ruled jointly.
Balthasar	1486; Second son of Burkhard Vand Magdalena of Mecklenburg-Stargard	3 November 1505 – 27 October 1535	County of Barby-Mühlingen	Unmarried	27 October 1535 aged 48–49	Children of Burkhard V, ruled jointly.
Christoph	1496; Seventh son of Burkhard Vand Magdalena of Mecklenburg-Stargard	3 November 1505 – 13 April 1523	County of Barby-Mühlingen	Unmarried	13 April 1523; Magdeburg aged 38–39	Children of Burkhard V, ruled jointly.
Wolfgang I	1502; Barby; Tenth son of Burkhard Vand Magdalena of Mecklenburg-Stargard	3 November 1505 – 24 January 1564	County of Barby-Mühlingen	Agnes of Middle Mansfeld; 23/27 January 1526; Seeburg sixteen children	24 January 1564; Barby aged 61–62	Children of Burkhard V, ruled jointly.
Regency of Joachim I Nestor, Elector of Brandenburg (1507-1520)						Left no descendants. After his death, his inheritance was absorbed by the Margraviate of Brandenburg.
Wichmann	c.1500 Son of Joachim and Margaret of Hohnstein	14 February 1507 – 28 March 1524	Lordship of Lindow-Ruppin	Unmarried	28 March 1524 aged 23–24	Left no descendants. After his death, his inheritance was absorbed by the Margraviate of Brandenburg.
Lindow-Ruppin annexed to Brandenburg
Wolfgang II	21 December 1531; Barby; Second son of Wolfgang I and Agnes of Middle Mansfeld	24 January 1564 – 23 March 1615	County of Barby-Mühlingen	Elisabeth of Anhalt-Zerbst; 19 July 1570; Bernburg one child Anna of Inne Mansfeld (1555-30 July 1575); 1 July 1575; Schleiz no children Marie Jacqueline of Baden-Durlach (October 1514 – 1592); 9 February 1577; Weimar no children Elisabeth of Kummerstedt (d.21 June 1621); 25 March 1593 no children	23 March 1615; Barby aged 83	Children of Wolfgang I, ruled jointly.
Albert X	15 February 1534; Barby; Fourth son of Wolfgang I and Agnes of Middle Mansfeld	24 January 1564 – 28 May 1588	County of Barby-Mühlingen	Maria of Anhalt-Zerbst; 25 August 1559 two children	28 May 1588; Barby aged 54	Children of Wolfgang I, ruled jointly.
Burkhard VIII	7 February 1536; Barby; Fifth son of Wolfgang I and Agnes of Middle Mansfeld	24 January 1564 – 28 May 1588	County of Barby-Mühlingen	Unmarried	2 June 1586; Barby aged 50	Children of Wolfgang I, ruled jointly.
Günther VII	17 October 1541; Barby; Eighth son of Wolfgang I and Agnes of Middle Mansfeld	24 January 1564 – 25 September 1572	County of Barby-Mühlingen	Unmarried	25 September 1572; Copenhagen aged 30	Children of Wolfgang I, ruled jointly.
Jobst II	8 May 1544; Barby; Tenth son of Wolfgang I and Agnes of Middle Mansfeld	24 January 1564 – 9 August 1609	County of Barby-Mühlingen	Anna of Pomerania-Stettin; 23 September 1576 no children Sophia of Schwarzburg-Rudolstadt; 30 March 1595; Rudolstadt three children	9 August 1609; Rosenburg aged 65	Children of Wolfgang I, ruled jointly.
Albert Frederick	28 February 1597; Rosenburg; First son of Jobst II and Sophia of Schwarzburg-Rudolstadt	23 March 1615 – 7 December 1641	County of Barby-Mühlingen (at Rosenburg and Mühlingen)	Sophia Ursula of Oldenburg-Delmenhorst; 17 March 1633 five children	7 December 1641; Rosenburg aged 44	Children of Jobst II, divided their inheritance.
Jobst Günther	15 October 1598; Mühlingen; Second son of Jobst II and Sophia of Schwarzburg-Rudolstadt	23 March 1615 – 19 April 1651	County of Barby-Mühlingen (at Barby)	Unmarried	19 April 1651; Walternienburg aged 52	Children of Jobst II, divided their inheritance.
Barby reattached to Mühlingen
August Louis	5 August 1639; Rosenburg; Son ofAlbert Frederickand Sophia Ursula of Oldenburg-Delmenhorst	7 December 1641 – 17 October 1659	County of Barby-Mühlingen (at Rosenburg and Mühlingen)	Unmarried	17 October 1659; Wolfenbüttel aged 20	
Barby-Mühlingen divided between Anhalt-Zerbst and Saxe-Weissenfels

== Literature ==
=== Specific sources ===
- Gerd Heinrich: Die Grafen von Arnstein (= Reinhold Olesch, Walter Schlesinger, Ludwig Erich Schmitt [Hrsg.]: Mitteldeutsche Forschungen. Band 21). Böhlau Verlag, Köln / Graz 1961, Zweiter Teil. Entstehung und Ausbildung der Herrschaften der Grafen von Arnstein, Grafen von Barby und Grafen von Lindow. VIII. Die Herrschaften Lindau und Möckern
- Friedrich Heine: Geschichte der Grafschaft Mühlingen. Paul Schettlers Erben GmbH, Köthen 1900 (Online version)

=== General sources ===
- Ernst Heinrich Kneschke: Neues allgemeines deutsches Adels-Lexicon. Band 1, Leipzig 1859, S. 113.
- Leopold von Ledebur: Die Grafen von Valkenstein am Harze und ihre Stammgenossen: Mit 5 Abbildungen u. 2 Stammtafeln. 1847, S. 94.
- Christian Friedrich August von Meding: „Nachrichten von adelichen Wapen“. Band 3, 1791, S. 10–11.
- Karl Friedrich Pauli: Allgemeine preussissche Staats-Geschichte, bis auf gegenwärtige Regierung. Band 1, 1761, S. 588 ff.
- Heinrich Leo: Vorlesungen über die Geschichte des deutschen Volkes und Reiches. Band 5, Teil 2, S. 1002f.
