= Buttlar family =

The Buttlar family (also Butler, Buttler or Treusch von Buttlar) is the name of an old Upper Franconian-Hessian noble family. The lords of Buttlar originate from the ancient nobility (German: uradel) of Buchonia. Branches of the family also reached Westphalia, Saxony, Prussia, Curonia, France, Poland, Russia and Hungary, and remain partly to this day. The Buttlar and Treusch von Buttlar families of Hessen has since 1660 belonged to the Old Hessian Knighthood, the oldest foundation in Hessen.

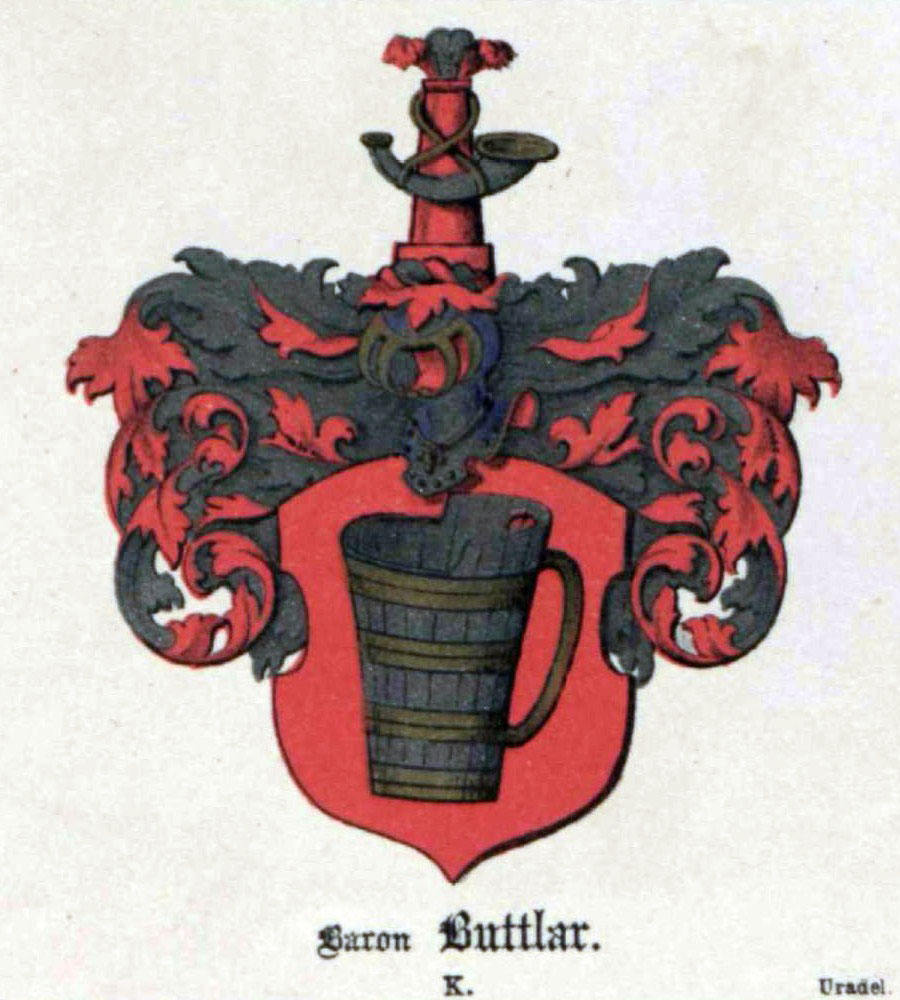
Arms of Buttlar (Baron)

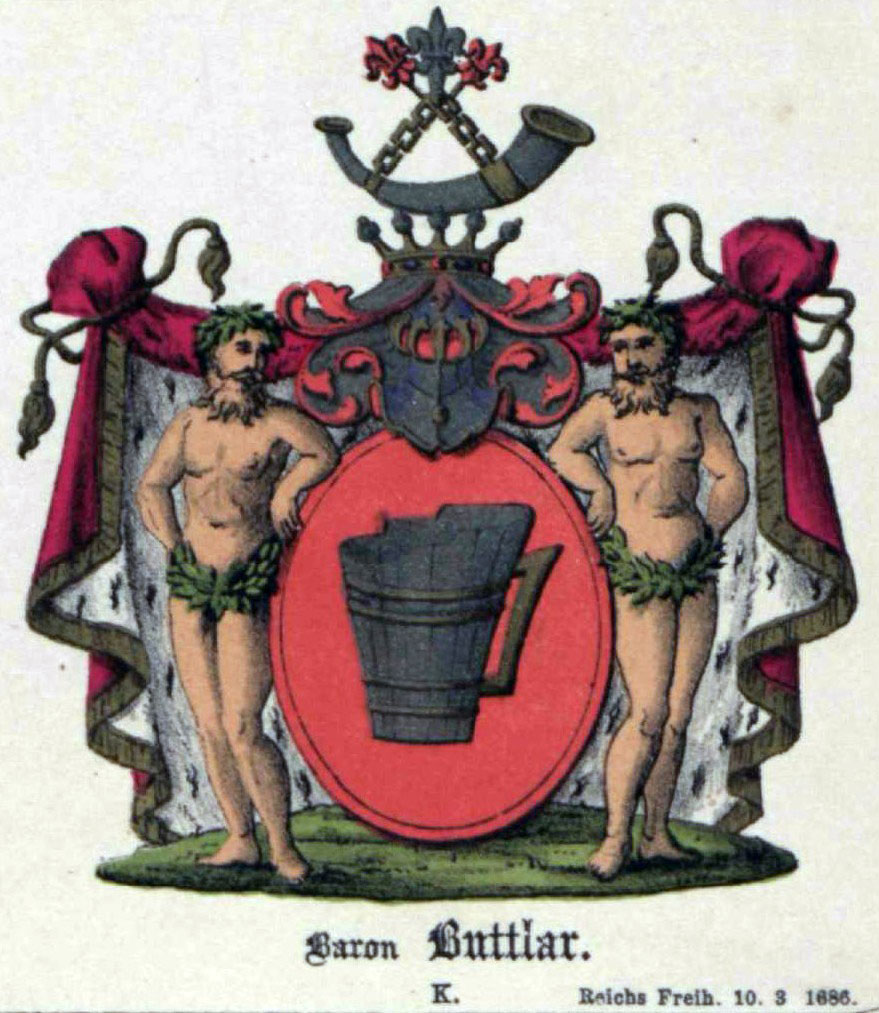
Arms of Buttlar (Baron)

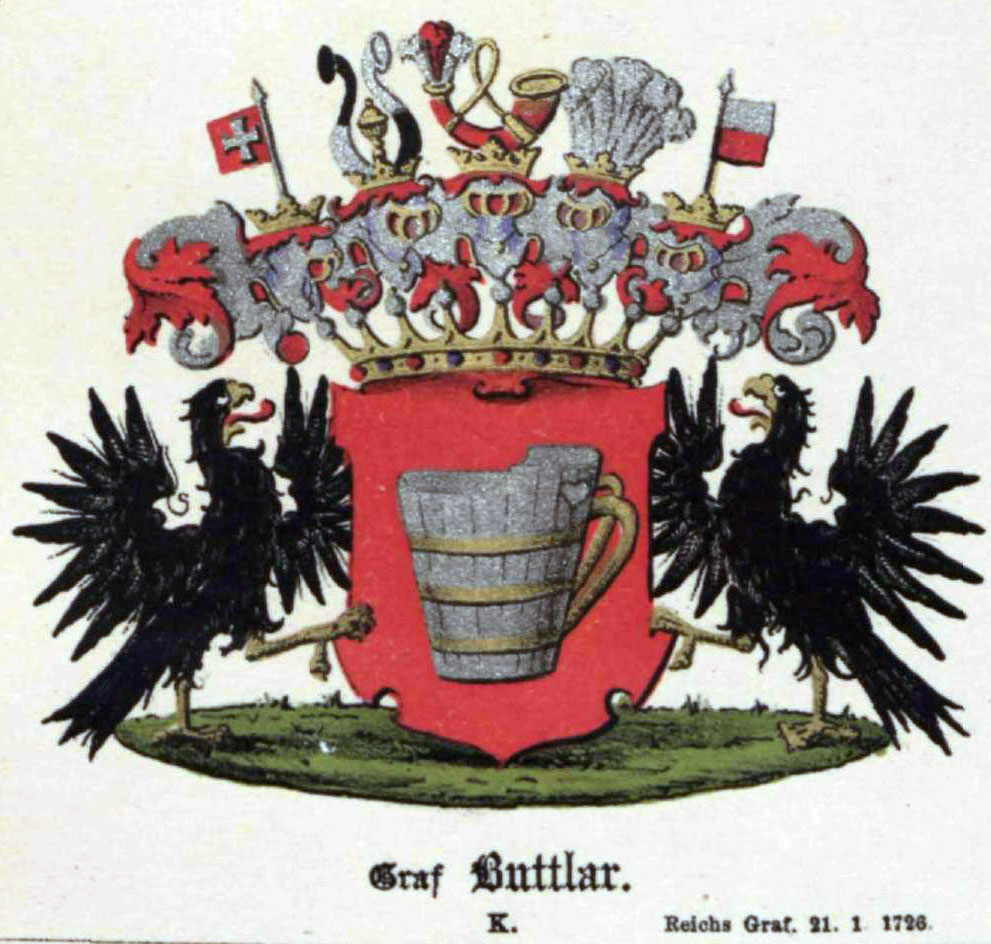
Arms of Buttlar (Count)

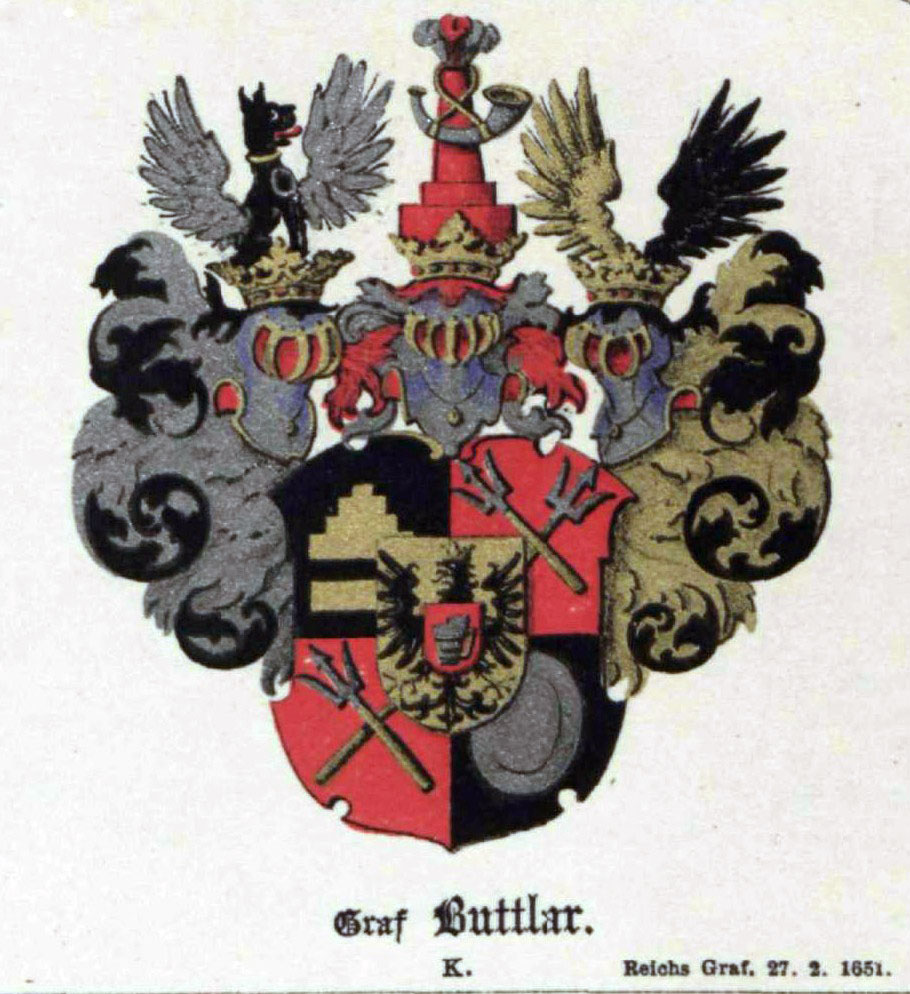
Arms of Buttlar (Count)

== Known family members ==
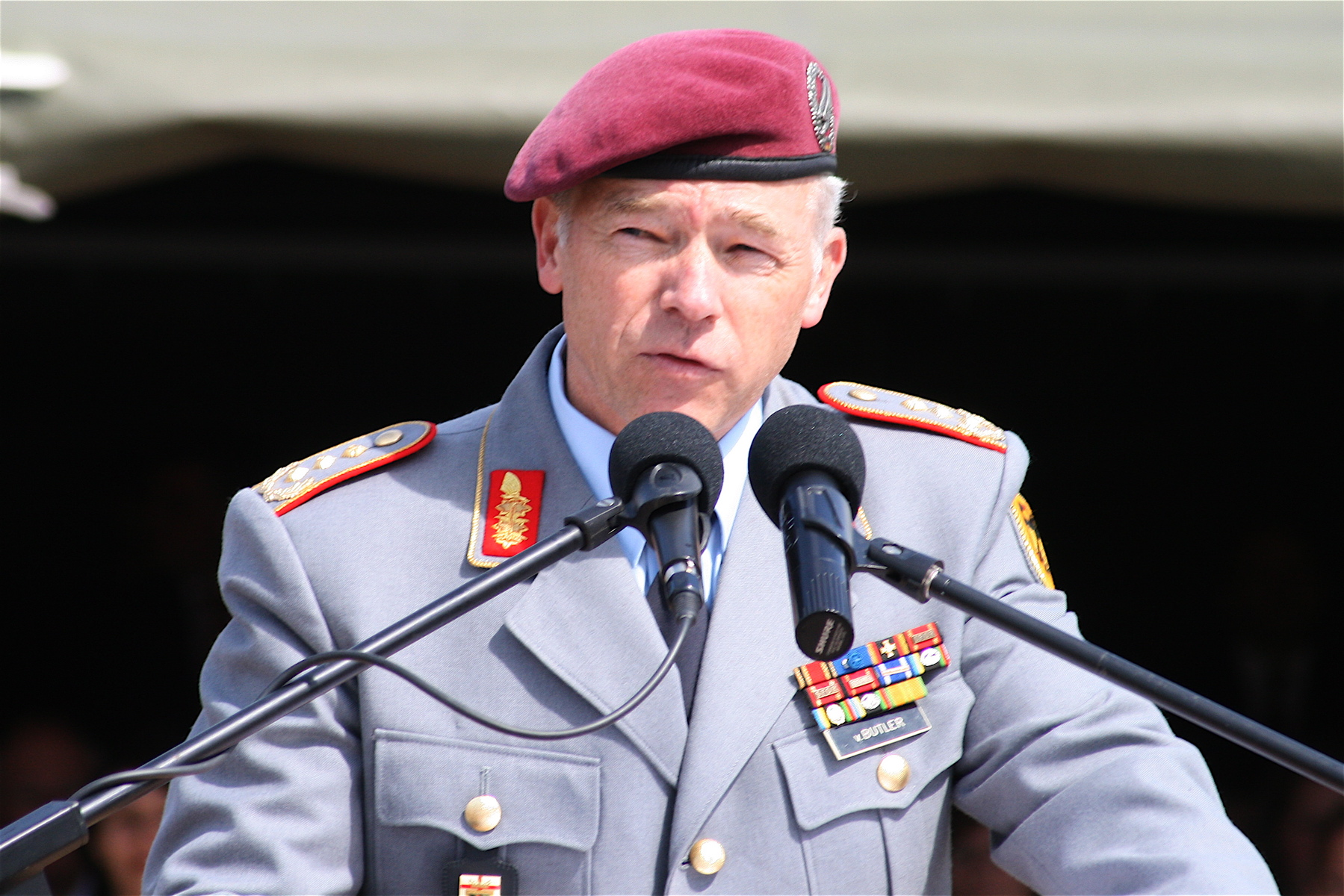
Lieutenant General Carl-Hubertus von Butler speaking in Leipzig (2010)

- Adrian von Buttlar (1948—), German art historian (de)
- Alfred von Buttlar-Moscon (1898–1972), Austrian writer, poet and translator (de)
- Augusta von Buttlar (1793–1866), German portrait and miniature painter (de)
- Carl-Hubertus von Butler (1950—), Lieutenant General of the Bundeswehr (de)
- Edgar von Buttlar (1889–1955), German Major general
- Egon Freiherr von Buttlar (1899–1987), conductor, entertainer and pianist
- Eva von Buttlar (1670–1721), German mystic (de)
- Franz Adolph von Buttlar (1727–1803), Geheimer Rat for the Electorate of Mainz, Electorate of Trier and Princely-Fulda, Knight of the Order of the Golden Lion
- Georg von Buttlar der Ältere (1408–1489), court servant for landgrave Louis I of Hesse, acquired the Lordship of Ziegenberg in 1451 as Pfandschaft
- Georg von Buttlar der Jüngere, bought the Lordship of Ziegenberg in 1494 and received it as a hereditary fief
- Georg Daniel von Buttlar (1671–1725), Knight of the Teutonic Order (de)
- Gerda Freifrau Treusch von Buttlar-Brandenfels (1894–1975), German writer (de)
- Hans Heinrich Treusch von Buttlar, Honourable member of the Fruitbearing Society
- Haro von Buttlar (—2000), German physicist
- Herbert von Buttlar (1912–1976), German classical archeologist and manager of science (de)
- Horst Freiherr Treusch von Buttlar-Brandenfels (1900–1990), German Major general
- Horst Julius Freiherr Treusch von Buttlar-Brandenfels (1885–1962), German airship commander
- Horst von Buttlar (1975—), German journalist (de)
- Johann Anton Franz von Buttlar (1685–1731), Upper Rhineian, Prussian and Imperial Major general (de)
- Johannes von Buttlar (1982-), German jazz musician
- Johann Christoph von Buttlar († 1705), Major general (de)
- Julius Adolf Friedrich Treusch von Buttlar (1716–1784), Major general (de)
- Konstantin von Buttlar (1679–1726), Prince Abbot of Fulda (de)
- Ludwig Treusch von Buttlar-Brandenfels (1804–1872), Lieutenant General
- Ludwig von Buttlar (1850–1928), Landrat (de)
- Peter von Butler (1913–2010), Lieutenant General of the Bundeswehr (de)
- Peter von Butler (diplomat) (1940–2014), German diplomat (de)
- Robert Treusch von Buttlar-Brandenfels, German spy who repeatedly switched sides between 1936 and 1945, and who gained fame through the process of the Bad Nenndorf interrogation centre.
- Rudolf von Buttlar (1802–1875), German forester, inventor and politician (de)
- Ruprecht von Butler (1924—), Major general of the Bundeswehr (de)
- Ruprecht Horst von Butler (1967—), Brigadier general of the Bundeswehr (de)
- Walter Treusch von Buttlar-Brandenfels (1865–1954), Major general
- Wilhelm Treusch von Buttlar-Brandenfels (1814–1889), Major general
- Wolfgang Treusch von Buttlar-Brandenfels (1861–1928), Lieutenant general

== Literature ==
- Ernst Heinrich Kneschke: Neues allgemeines deutsches Adels-Lexicon. Vol. 3, Friedrich Voigt's Buchhandlung, Leipzig 1861, pp. 180–182. (Digitalisat)
- Heinrich Laag (1957). "Buttlar, von". Neue Deutsche Biographie (in German). Vol. 3. Berlin: Duncker & Humblot. pp. 80–80. (full text online).
- Leopold von Zedlitz-Neukirch: Neues preussisches Adelslexicon. Vol. 2, Gebrüder Reichenbach, Leipzig 1836, pp. 442–444. (Digitalisat)
- Ludwig von Buttlar: Das Werden unseres Geschlechts, Vacha (Rhön) 1925, [2. Aufl.]
- Genealogisches Handbuch des in Bayern immatrikulierten Adels, hrsg. von der Vereinigung des Adels in Bayern, Vol. 11, pp. 519–522.
- Genealogisches Handbuch des Adels, Adelslexikon Vol. II, Vol. 58 der Gesamtreihe, C. A. Starke Verlag, Limburg (Lahn) 1974, ISSN 0435-2408
