= Sandizell =

Bavarian Noble Family

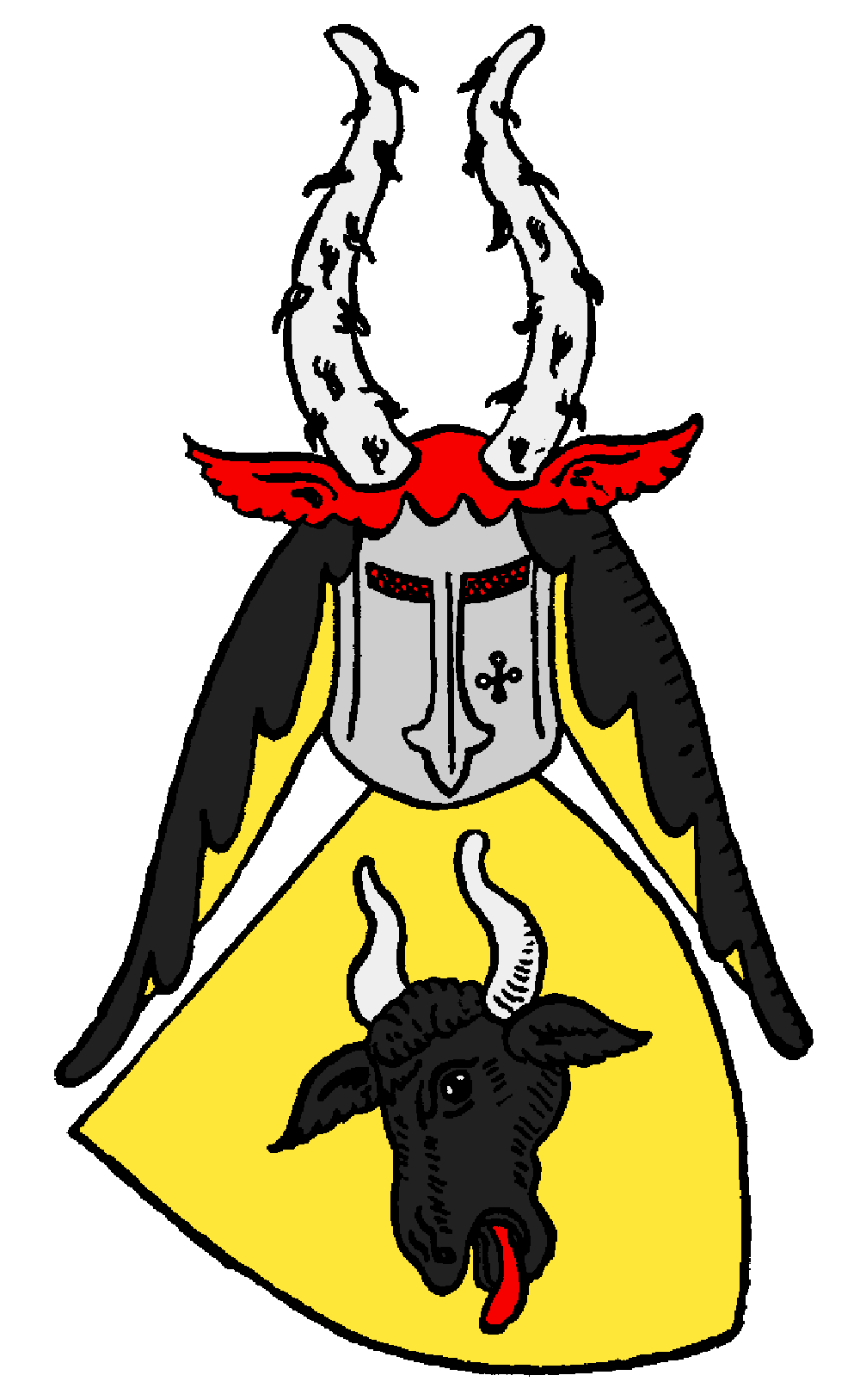
The Sandizell coat of arms (c. 12th century)

The Sandizell family (also Lords, Counts of Sandizell or Sandicell, also Sandizell) is an old German noble family. The Lords of Sandizell belong to the old Bavarian nobility. Branches of the family exist to this day.

== Origins ==
The family is one of the oldest flourishing ministerial families from the time of the Counts of Scheyern. The family was first mentioned with Arnoldus de Sandizelle, who was mentioned from 1171 to 1190.

Sandizell castle, in Sandizell is the ancestral seat of the family and is today a district of Schrobenhausen in the Upper Bavarian district of Neuburg-Schrobenhausen. It was first mentioned in 1007 and has been in the family's possession since the end of the 11th century.

== Family Coat of Arms ==
The family coat of arms shows in gold a slanting left, red-tongued, silver-armored black buffalo head; on the helmet with black and gold helmet covers two buffalo horns covered with ermine fur with red forehead fur and red ears.

== Gallery ==
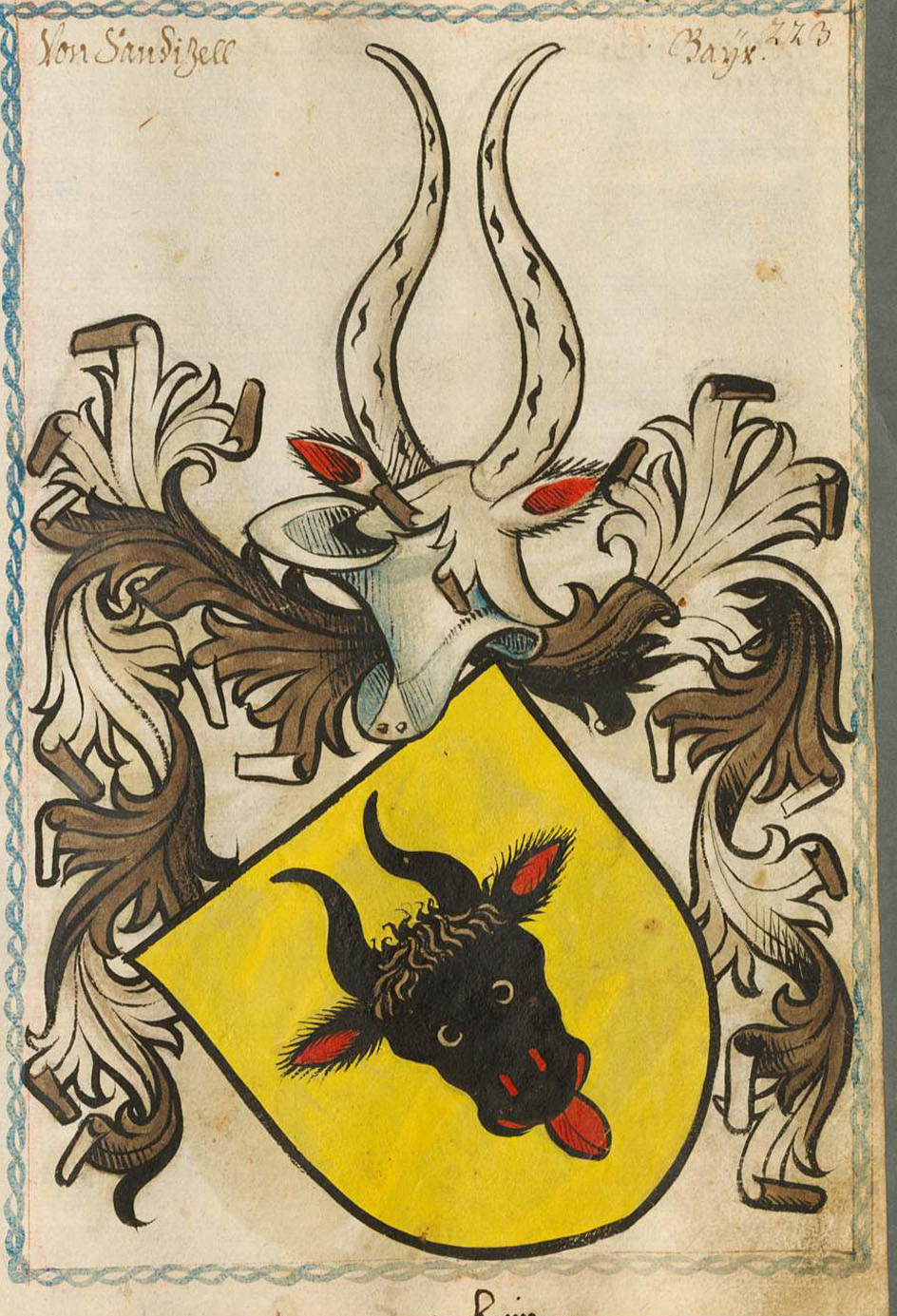
Coat of arms of the von Sandizell family from Scheibler's armorial book from around 1495.

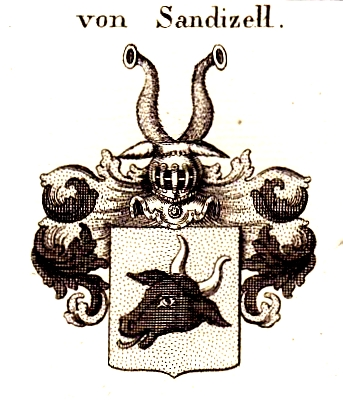
Coat of arms of the barons of Sandizell, from Tyroff's armorial book of the entire nobility of the Kingdom of Bavaria, 1820.

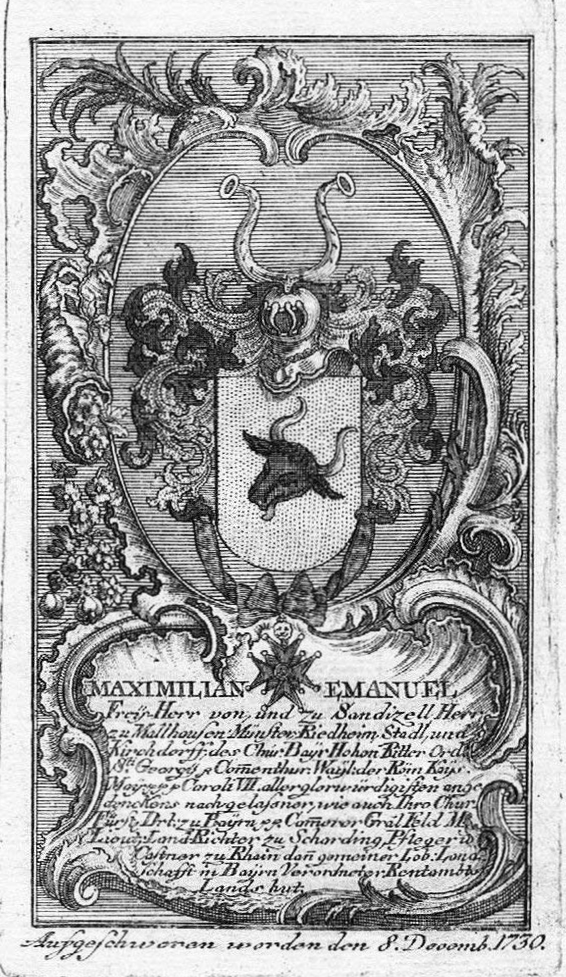
Coat of arms of Maximilian Emanuel Freiherr von Sandizell (1702–1778)

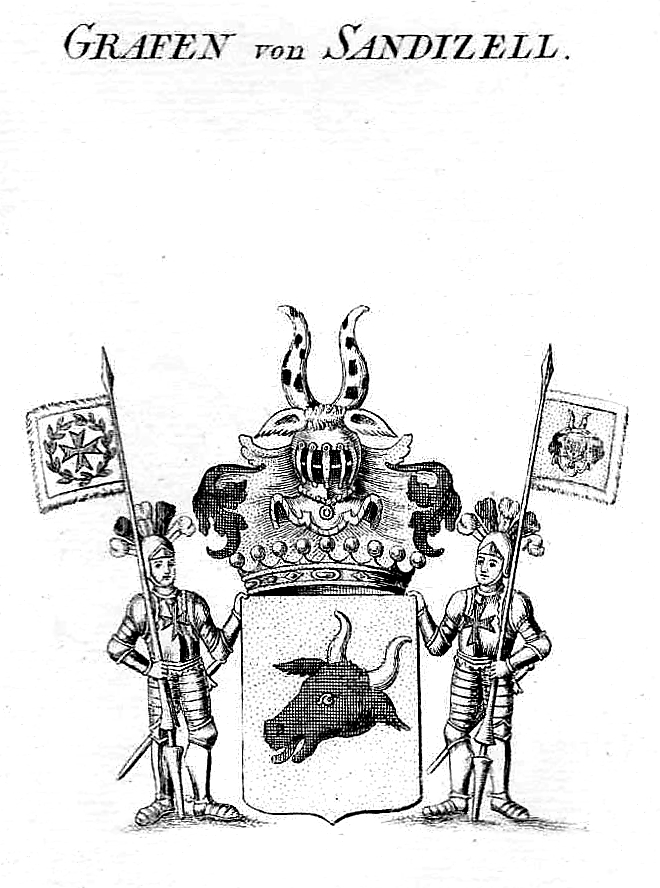
Coat of arms of the Counts Sandizell in the coat of arms book of the entire nobility of the Kingdom of Bavaria, 1818

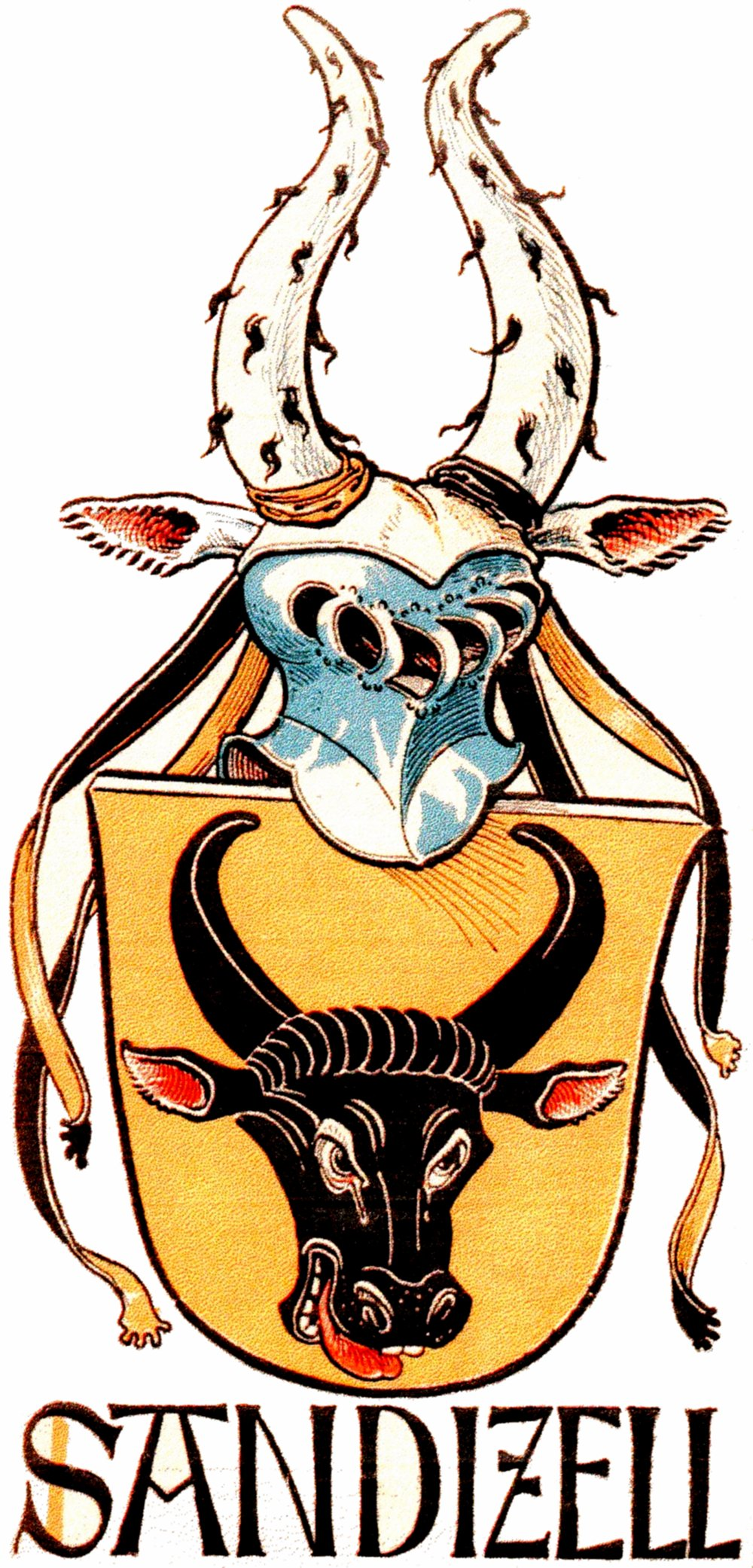
Coat of arms of those from Sandizell. From the Otto Hupp, Munich calendar 1902

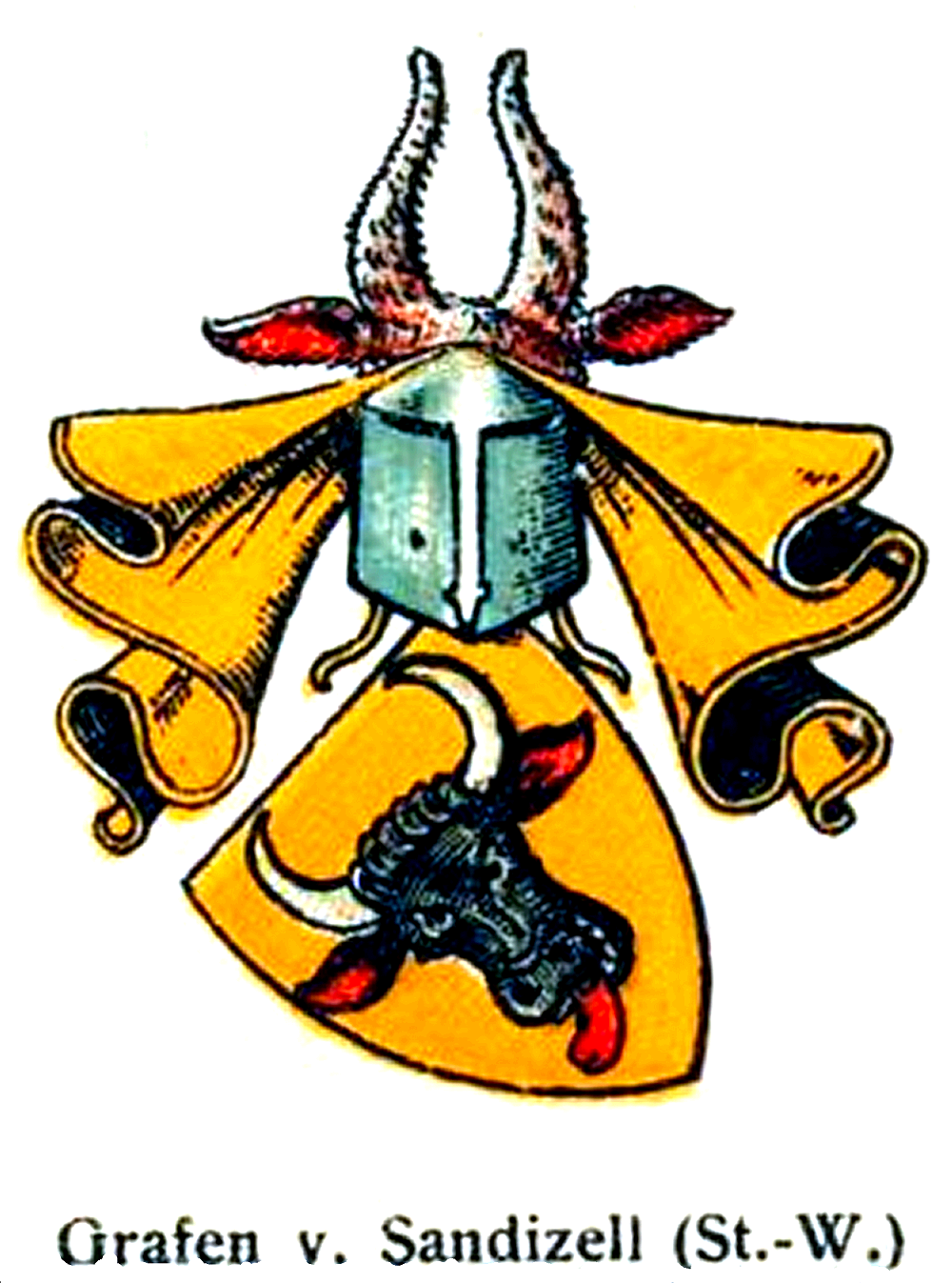
Family coat of arms of those from Sandizell, from Adolf Matthias Hildebrandt's coat of arms collection

== Literature ==
- Otto Hupp: Munich calendar 1902. Book & Printer AG, Munich/Regensburg 1902.
- Ernst Heinrich Kneschke: Neues allgemeines deutsches Adels-Lexicon Volume 8, Friedrich Voigt's Bookstore, Leipzig 1868, pp. 40-41.
- Alexander Langheiter: high prant from Sandizell. In: Miesbach - A cultural guide. Maurus, Miesbach 2006, pp. 393–394.

Genealogisches Handbuch des Adels: Nobility Lexicon Volume XII. Volume 125 of the complete series, CA Starke Verlag, Limburg (Lahn) 2001, pp. 238-240

== Itemizations ==
1. Gerhard Köbler: Historical lexicon of the German states. The German territories from the Middle Ages to the present. 7th, completely revised edition. CH Beck, Munich 2007.
2. Genealogisches Handbuch des Adels, Nobility Encyclopedia Volume XII, Volume 125 of the complete series, pp. 238–240.
3. Haus der Bayerischen Geschichte
4. Upper Bavarian Archive, Volume 24, Documents of the Indersdorf Monastery, No. 21

== See also ==
- German nobility
- Bavaria
