= Ernst August Moritz von Froelich =

Officer of the Prussian Army (1787–1858)

- Born: January 13, 1787
- Died: October 25, 1858 (aged 71)
- Military career
- Allegiance: Prussia
- Branch: Prussian Army
- Commands: 3rd Cavalry Brigade
- Conflicts: French Revolutionary Wars; Napoleonic Wars

Ernst August Moritz von Froelich (13 January 1787 – 25 October 1858) was an officer in the Prussian Army during the French Revolutionary Wars and the Napoleonic Wars, rising to lieutenant general and commander of 3rd Cavalry Brigade. He was born in Medzibor-Neu Mittelwalde in the Duchy of Oels and died in Schmiedeberg im Riesengebirge.

== Bibliography (in German) ==
- Kurt von Priesdorff: Soldatisches Führertum. Hanseatische Verlagsanstalt, Hamburg, Nr.1573, Band 5, S. 323–235
- Ernst Heinrich Kneschke, Neues allgemeines deutsches Adels-Lexicon, Band 3, S.374
- Zeitschrift für Kunst, Wissenschaft, und Geschichte des Krieges, Band 105, S.227ff Nekrolog
- Berliner Revue, Band 16, S.328f Nekrolog
