= Ferdinand, Landgrave of Hesse-Homburg =

Ferdinand
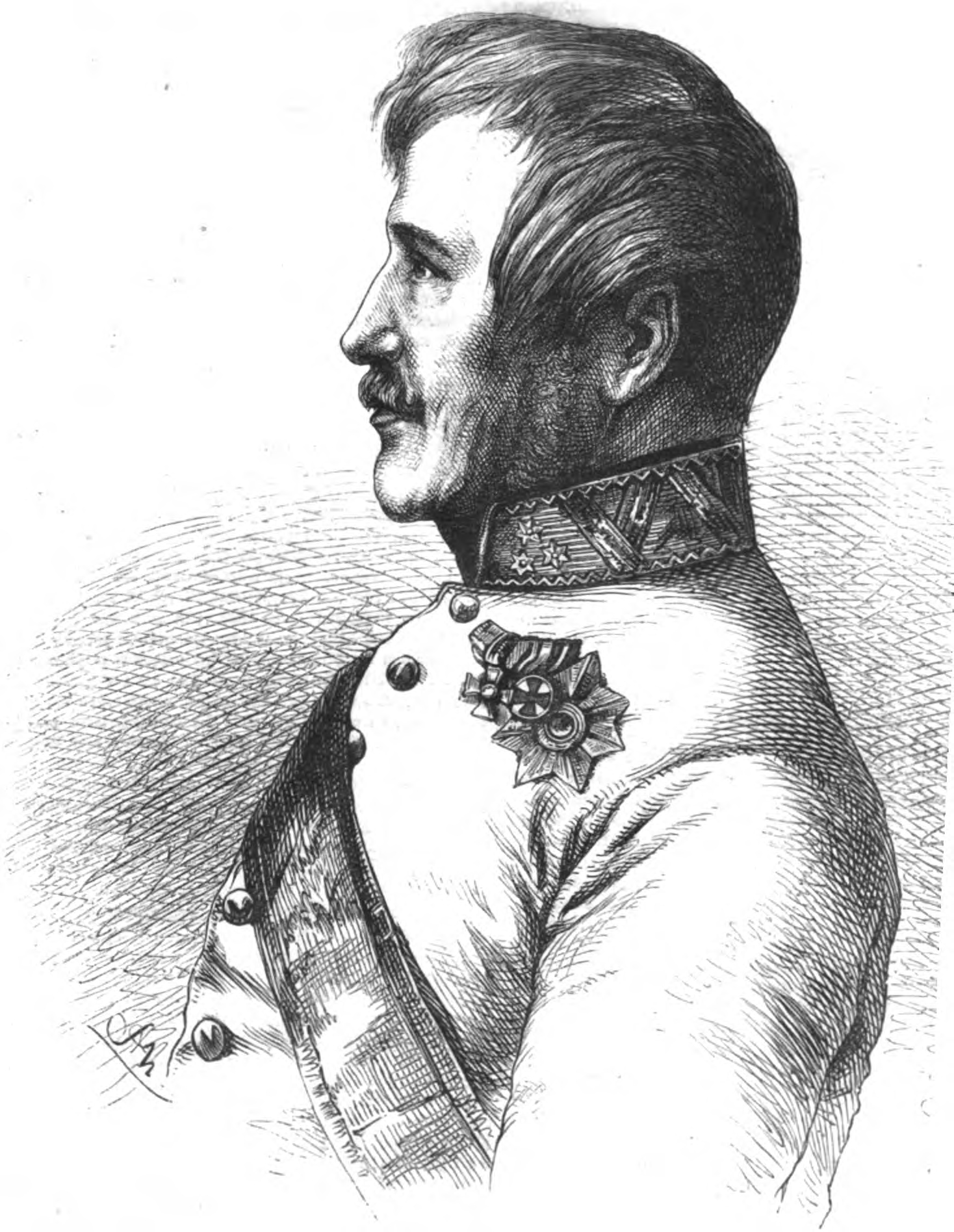

Landgrave of Hesse-Homburg
- Reign: 8 September 1848 – 24 March 1866
- Predecessor: Gustav, Landgrave of Hesse-Homburg
- Successor: None (line extinct; territory inherited by Louis III, Grand Duke of Hesse then annexed by William of Prussia)
- Born: 26 April 1783; Bad Homburg vor der Höhe
- Died: 24 March 1866 (aged 82); Bad Homburg vor der Höhe
- House: Hesse
- Father: Frederick V, Landgrave of Hesse-Homburg
- Mother: Landgravine Caroline of Hesse-Darmstadt

Ferdinand Heinrich Friedrich (26 April 1783 – 24 March 1866) was a German nobleman and the last landgrave of Hesse-Homburg.

== Life ==
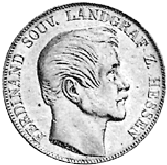
Coin of Ferdinand

He was born in Bad Homburg vor der Höhe in 1783, the fifth of six sons born to Frederick V, Landgrave of Hesse-Homburg and his wife Caroline, eldest daughter of Louis IX, Landgrave of Hesse-Darmstadt and his wife Caroline. From 1800 to 1817 he served in the Karl von Lothringen Regiment, a hussar unit in the Austrian Imperial Army. Contemporary reports stated he had "the ideal form of a heavy cavalryman". He fought in all the major engagements of the Napoleonic Wars and was badly wounded several times. After the battle of Leipzig Francis II granted him the Order of Maria Theresa, the highest Austrian military order. In 1822 he left active service with the rank of General of Cavalry (Feldzeugmeister). He never married and according to Herbert Rosendorfer became "very old and very reactionary". He lived with his personal bodyguard or leibjäger in the Orangery, a modest lodge adjoining Bad Homburg Castle, where he devoted himself to his two main hobbies, hunting and the Romano-German era of the Taunus.

After the deaths of his four elder brothers without surviving male issue, he inherited the landgraviate from his brother Gustav in 1848. However, his lack of any male relations or issue made it clear that he would be the last landgrave of Hesse-Homburg even before his accession – his only younger brother, Leopold, had been killed in 1813. He extended his personal extreme frugality to the parlous state finances in a vain attempt to regain control – they had largely been ruined by his brother Philipp's granting a concession for a casino to the Blanc brothers.

The Revolutions of 1848 had a major impact even on so small a state as Hesse-Homburg and thus Ferdinand set up a state convention or 'landtag' in April 1849. He also re-confirmed the constitution accepted by Gustav, though he revoked it on 20 April 1852 at the end of the German National Parliament and reinstated authoritarian personal rule until his death. In September 1850 he was one of the first princes to send representatives to the restored Federal Convention. He died without issue in Bad Homburg in 1866 – his remains filled the last space in the vault at Bad Homburg Castle. Hesse-Homburg was briefly inherited by Louis III, Grand Duke of Hesse, before being annexed by Prussia later in 1866 after the Austro-Prussian War.

== Bibliography ==
- (in German) BLKO
- (in German) Walther (1877). "Ferdinand" . Allgemeine Deutsche Biographie (in German). Vol. 6. Leipzig: Duncker & Humblot. pp. 690–691.
- (in German) Karl Schwartz: Landgraf Friedrich V. von Hessen-Homburg und seine Familie. Aus Archivalien und Familienpapieren, Rudolstadt 1878
- (in German) "Hessen-Homburg Ferdinand Heinrich Landgf. von". In: Österreichisches Biographisches Lexikon 1815–1950 (ÖBL). Vol. 2, Austrian Academy of Sciences, Vienna 1959, p. 305.

Ferdinand, Landgrave of Hesse-Homburg House of Hesse Born: 26 April 1783 Died: 24 March 1866
Preceded by Gustav	Landgrave of Hesse-Homburg; 1848–1866	Extinct
