= Lordship of Ruppin =

German feudal territory

Lordship of Ruppin Herrschaft Ruppin (German)
- ~1214–1524
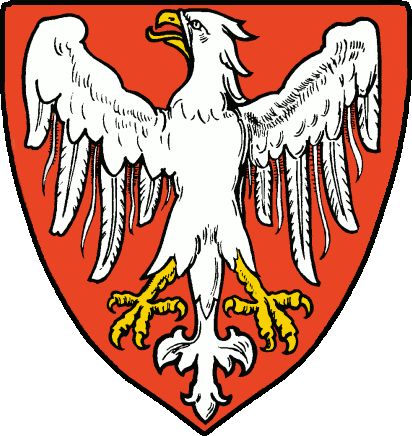
- Coat of arms

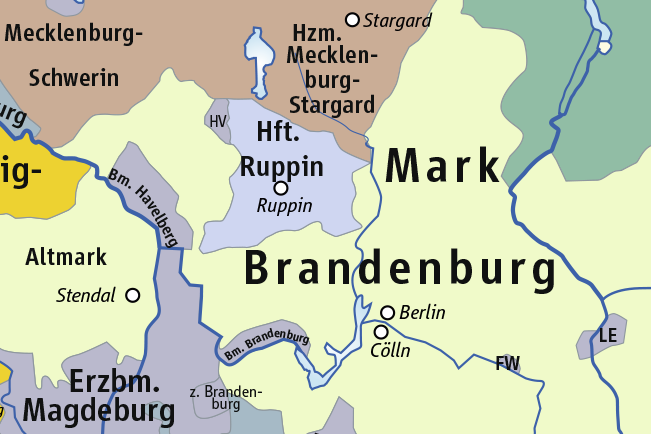
- Lordship of Ruppin ~1400
- Status: State of the Holy Roman Empire
- Capital: Castle Ruppin (1240-1524)
- Largest city: Neuruppin
- Common languages: Low German
- Religion: Catholicism
- Government: Feudal Lordship
- Lord of Ruppin
  - ~1214-~1256: Bernhard von Arnstein (first)
  - ?-1524: Count Wichmann (last)
- Historical era: Late Middle Ages
  - Established: ~1214
  - Annexed by Brandenburg: 1524
- Currency: Guilder
Succeeded by
Margraviate of Brandenburg
- Today part of: Ostprignitz-Ruppin

The Lordship of Ruppin was a feudal lordship of the Holy Roman Empire centered around the town of Neuruppin. The Lords of Ruppin held up residence in Castle Ruppin since 1240. The lordship was under the rule of the Lindow-Ruppin family from about 1214 until 1524 before being annexed by the Margraviate of Brandenburg.

== History ==
Around 1214, land between the rivers, Stemnitz and Rhin, was acquired by Count Bernhard von Arnstein. He is the forefather of the Lindow-Ruppin family who went on to rule the lordship until its annexation by Brandenburg in 1524. The lordship was a part of the Upper Saxon Circle. The lordship was meant to provide 15 soldiers with 3 on horseback and 12 on foot as well as 42 guilders for the Imperial Army.

In 1524, the Lindow-Ruppin line of succession ended with the death of Count Wichmann. The lordship was seized by Joachim I, being incorporated into the Margraviate of Brandenburg as the District of Ruppin. A relative of Count Wichmann sued the Imperial Chamber Court against the seizure of the lordship in 1541, but the case was dismissed in 1562.

The title of Countess of Ruppin was recreated in 1914 by Kaiser Wilhelm II for his daughter-in-law Countess Ina Marie von Bassewitz (but later she was titled also Princess of Prussia).
