= The Buttlars =

20th-century German musical duo

- Origin: Hamburg, Germany
- Genres: Classical; opera
- Years active: 1932–1960
- Members: Anita Wellmann (1908–1998); Egon von Buttlar (1899–1987)

The Buttlars (a.k.a. Duo Buttlar and The Two Buttlars) were a German musical duo who performed from 1933 to 1960 in various European countries. The duo consisted of Anita Wellmann from Hamburg and Egon von Buttlar from Berlin. They sang and accompanied themselves on two pianos and accordions. They excelled in virtuoso piano playing and performed a mix of classical pieces from operas and operettas, songs from popular films, and local music. Anita Wellmann was Jewish, and Egon von Buttlar was of German nobility. In 1937, the Reich Chamber of Music, refused them a permit to perform in Germany because of Anita's ethnicity, which led to their exile. From 1940 onwards, they performed in the Netherlands, where they went into hiding in 1944 and 1945. After the Second World War, they obtained Dutch citizenship and continued to perform until 1960.

== Members ==
=== Anita Wellmann ===
Anita Wellmann was born on January 10, 1908, in Altona, Hamburg. Her parents, Samuel Wellmann and Eugenia Weinberg, emigrated from Galati, Romania, to Hamburg in 1899 and settled in Altona in 1901, where many relatives lived. In Altona, Samuel and two brothers ran a fish, cigarette, and later wine business. Anita grew up in the Jewish quarter of Grindel in Hamburg. According to the guestbooks they left behind, one of her first piano concerts took place on December 4, 1926, in the "Festsaal Oberrealschule" (assembly hall of the Upper Secondary School) in Hamburg. Anita took singing lessons at the "Alice Reichwaldt Gesangschule" (Music Academy) in Hamburg. Anita's parents were forced to return to Galati in 1934. Her uncles' wine business was confiscated by the Gestapo in 1939. The records of the Wiedergutmachung files in the Hamburg State Archive show that many of Anita's relatives were murdered in concentration camps during the war, and some managed to escape to America.

=== Egon von Buttlar ===
Egon Gustav Treusch von Buttlar- Brandenfels was born in 1899 in Berlin-Schöneberg. He was the youngest son of Egon Carl Louis von Buttlar, a lieutenant in the Royal Prussian Army, and Marie Wilhelmine Ida Pilling, from Hamburg. Egon grew up in Berlin Karlshorst, in the Auguste-Viktoria-Strasse where his parents had lived since 1909. According to his life story in the documents for his exile compensation request in 1956, from the age of eight, he attended the Leibniz-Gymnasium in Berlin-Kreuzberg on the Mariannenplatz. Before graduating, he became a Fahnenjunker in the 3rd Guards Infantry Regiment of the Prussian Army in 1917. At the age of 18, in 1918, Egon was promoted to lieutenant. After the war, Egon was a prisoner of war in France in the Groues camp near Orleans. Upon his return in 1920, he abandoned his military career and took music lessons with Dr. Ludwig in Karlshorst. In the 1920s, Egon was a well-known figure in Charlottenburg nightlife. He performed as a bar pianist at the Casanova and the Greifi Bar, among other places. He was not only a pianist but also a renowned sportsman and caricaturist.

== Career ==
=== Performing in Hamburg and Berlin (1931–1936) ===
In October 1931, Egon left for Hamburg, where he met Anita Wellmann. On December 29, 1931, they performed as a duo for the first time at the CSB Bar and then in various entertainment venues in Hamburg. In 1932, they performed with drummer and accordionist Eddy Simons and violinist Hans Kamman. The band was called "Egon Freiherr von Buttlar und seine Solisten" (Egon von Buttlar and his Soloists). On March 29, 1933, Egon married Anita Wellmann in Hamburg. The purge following the Nazi seizure of power in 1933 extended not only to local venues but also to the musical sphere. Following the takeover, a purge in line with National Socialist cultural ideology began. In September 1933, the Reich Chamber of Music was established, a compulsory body whose membership was a prerequisite for practicing as a musician. This provided the instrument for issuing professional bans excluding Jewish musicians from practicing their profession. From June 1934, the Buttlars performed as a duo in the bar of the Hotel Reichshof in Hamburg. In August 1935, they encountered difficulties due to Anita's Jewish background. Although the first racial laws only came into effect in September, people living in mixed marriages had already been literally insulted, reported, and arrested by the SA. To avoid the problems in Hamburg, they left for Düsseldorf, where they played at the Carlton Bar. There they encountered the same problems; they were unable to hide their mixed marriage. Egon applied for an exemption permit from the Reich Chamber of Music in Berlin. The permit was granted, and from December 1935 onwards they performed at the Greifi Bar, located in the West, the new, elegant and exclusive nightlife area around Joachimthalerstrasse and Kurfürstendamm. The complete exclusion of Jewish musicians began in 1935 with the systematic screening of all members and applicants regarding their 'Aryan' ancestry. Musicians and bandleaders who were no longer allowed to practice their profession were expelled from Germany, most of them because of their ancestry. The continued performances of The Buttlars were short-lived. In March 1936, the Control Department of the Brandenburg State Music Association received information indicating that Anita was Jewish. The Buttlars left for Münster, where they performed at the Roxel Bar. Egon was again granted permission to perform at the Greifi Bar in Berlin West for the first three months of 1937. In September of that year, the permit was definitively terminated. In 1940 the name of Anita was published in the 'Directory of Jewish Musicians', compiled on behalf of the Reich leadership of the NSDAP on the basis of official, party-approved documents, an anti-Semitic publication.

=== Exile in Vienna, Milan, Zurich, and The Hague (1937–1945) ===
In the autumn of 1937, the Buttlars traveled to Vienna where they performed at the Figaro Bar. They were in Vienna during the Anschluss in March 1938. Because the racial laws immediately applied to Austria after the Anschluss, they had no choice but to leave.They embarked on an exile tour through Europe, with engagements in the Piccolo in Milan, the Metropol in Zurich, and the Alhambra in Riga. When the Italian racial laws were introduced, they moved from Milan to Zurich. When Germany invaded Poland, the Buttlars performed in Fribourg in the Pernel Bar and the local authorities forced them to leave Switzerland. Because the Netherlands was still neutral, the Buttlars believed they were safe in the Netherlands and arrived in The Hague at Christmas 1939, where they performed at the Riche Bar. They were in Amsterdam when war broke out in the Netherlands. The Buttlars were trapped, and leaving the Netherlands was impossible. From 1941 onward, they performed at the Hotel Hamdorff in Laren. In 1943 and 1944, they were heard on various national radio programs. In 1944, Egon was forced to enlist in the German army, which was facing personnel shortages. He was appointed to the Waterloo Barracks in Amersfoort as the recording manager of the Dutch POW officers who had to report for forced labor. In March 1944, the army leadership in Amersfoort discovered that Egon had concealed his "mixed" marriage. His passport and ration coupons were confiscated, and his German citizenship was revoked. The Buttlars went into hiding in Hilversum until the liberation of the Netherlands in May 1945.

=== The Netherlands and the Compensation Allowance (1945–1960) ===
After the war, the Buttlars obtained Dutch citizenship. In 1952, the naturalization committee noted that Egon had become attached to the country and that he had been sufficiently assimilated. During the war in 1943/44 he served for nine months as an officer in the German army in the Netherlands. He was discharged due to his marriage to a Jewish woman. He used his uniform to serve Dutch interests as best he could. Thanks to his efforts, several interned officers and men of the Dutch army were able to regain their freedom. They lived for over twenty years in an upper floor apartment in the Piet Heinstraat in The Hague. Both Anita and Egon applied for a compensation allowance (Wiedergutmachung) from the German government, which was granted in 1960. They then permanently ceased performing. Egon von Buttlar died in The Hague on July 19, 1987. Anita von Buttlar-Wellmann died in The Hague on March 27, 1998. They left behind their "golden books", artist's books. These are 5 original artist's books of Egon and Anita von Buttlar covering the years 1933 to 1959 existing of photographs, performances by date and venue, messages and greetings from friends and autographs from celebrities. The first Golden Book was given to Egon by singer and actor Richard Tauber.In January 2026, the Buttlars' collection of "golden books," consisting of five books, was donated to the Jewish Museum in Berlin by the heiress of Egon von Buttlar.

== Works cited ==
- Beers van, C.M. (2012). "Duitse immigranten in het Zeeheldenkwartier. Een persoonlijke zoektocht naar de geschiedenis van het huis Piet Heinstraat 119 Den Haag" [German immigrants in the Zeeheldenkwartier. A personal search for the history of the house Piet Heinstraat 119 The Hague] (PDF). Jaarboek Geschiedkundige Vereniging Die Haghe en Vrienden van het Haags Historisch Museum (in Dutch) (Yearbook 2012). The Hague the Netherlands: Geschiedkundige Vereniging Die Haghe.
- Beers van, Carla; Alberti, Dirk (2025). Die Buttlars. Überleben durch Musik in der Zeit des Rassenwahns [The Buttlars: Surviving through Music in the Time of Racial Madness]. Akres. ISBN 9783910347724.
- Fetthauer, Sophie; Maurer Zenck, Claudia (2010). Petersen, Peter (ed.). "Anita Buttlar – Lexicon verfolgter Musiker und Musikerinnen in der NS-Zeit" [LexM – Encyclopedia of persecuted musicians of the Nazi era]. Anita Buttlar – LexM (in German). Hamburg: Universitat Hamburg UHH Institut für Historische Musikwissenschaft. Archived from the original on 28 Dec 2023.
- "Biografen – Datenbank: Frauen aus Hamburg. Anita Buttlar. Landescentrale für politische Bildung Hamburg 2025". hamburg-frauenbiografien.de (in German).
- Hueck v., Walter, ed. (1975). Genealogisches Handbuch des Adels [Genealogical Handbook of Nobility]. Band 59 (in German) (Freiherrliche Hauser A Band IX ed.). Limburg a.d. Lahn: C.A. Starke Verlag.
- Stengel, Theo Dr.; Gerigk, Herbert Dr. (1940). Lexicon der Juden in der Musik. Mit einer Titelverzeichnis Judischer Werke [Directory of Jewish Musicians. Compiled on behalf of the Reich leadership of the NSDAP on the basis of official, party-approved documents. Publications of the Institute of the NSDAP for Research on the Jewish Question. An anti-Semitic publication.] (in German). Berlin: Bernhard Hahnefeld Verlag.
- Weissweiler, Eva und Lili (1999). Ausgemerzt: das Lexicon der Juden in der Musik und seine morderischen Folgen (in German). Cologne: Dietrich Verlag. ISBN 3920862252.
- Wolffram, Knut (1992). Tanzdielen und Vergnügungspaläste. Berliner Nachtleben in den dreissiger und vierziger Jahren. Von der Friedrichstrasse bis Berlin W, vom Moka Efti bis zum Delphi [Dance halls and entertainment palaces. Berlin nightlife in the 1930s and 40s. From Friedrichstrasse to Berlin West, from the Moka Efti to the Delphi.] (in German) (4th ed.). Berlin: Edition Hentrich (published 2001). ISBN 9783894680473.
