= Leopold of Hesse-Homburg =

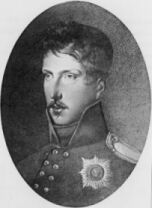
Leopold of Hesse-Homburg

Leopold Victor Friedrich of Hesse-Homburg (10 February 1787 – 2 May 1813) was a prince of Hesse-Homburg.

== Life ==
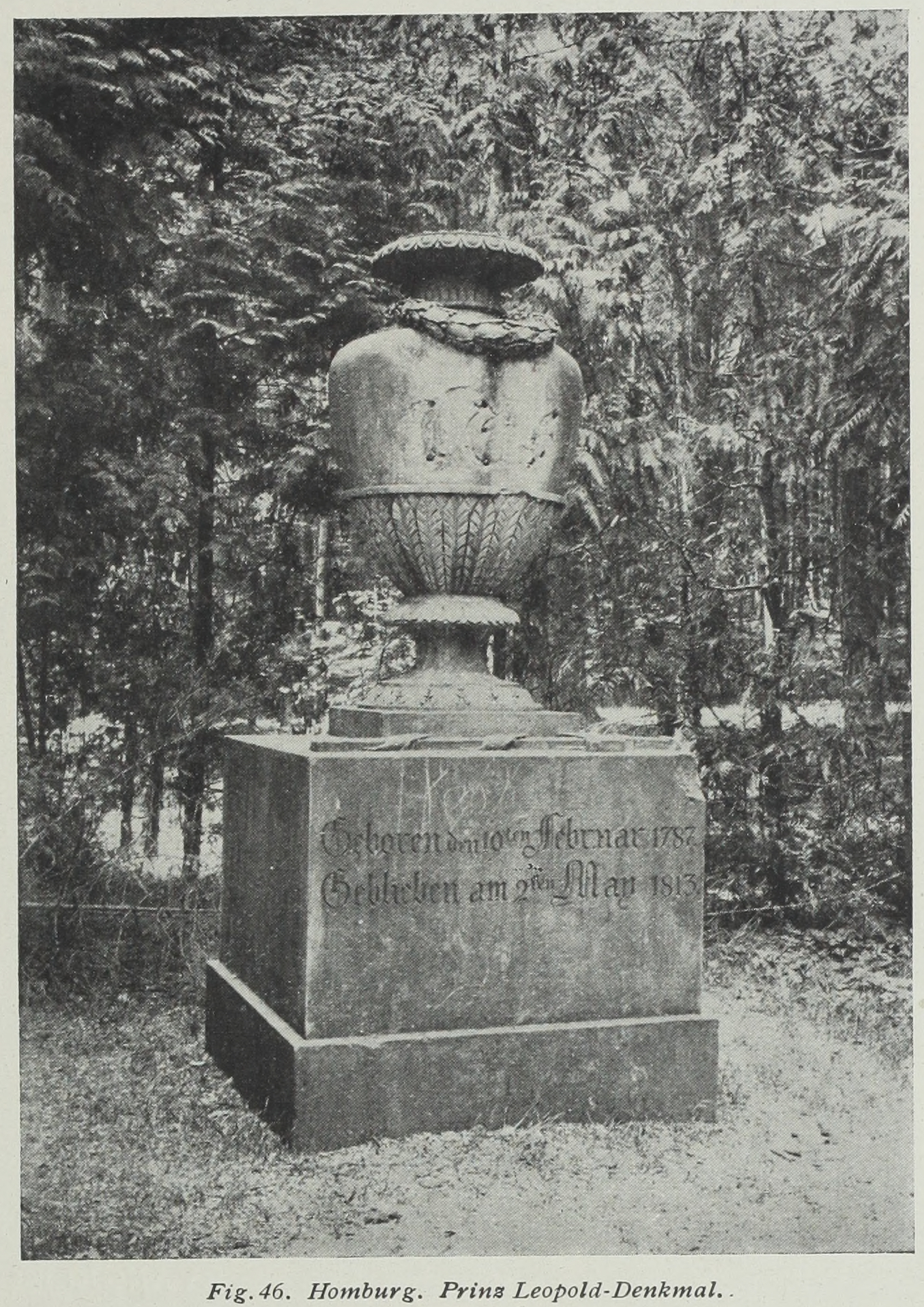
Monument to him in Bad Homburg

He was born in Homburg, the youngest of the fifteen children born to Frederick V, Landgrave of Hesse-Homburg and his wife Caroline of Hesse-Darmstadt, eldest daughter of Louis IX, Landgrave of Hesse-Darmstadt. He and all five of his brothers fought in the Napoleonic Wars, leading Napoleon to complain "Everywhere I find a Homburg!"

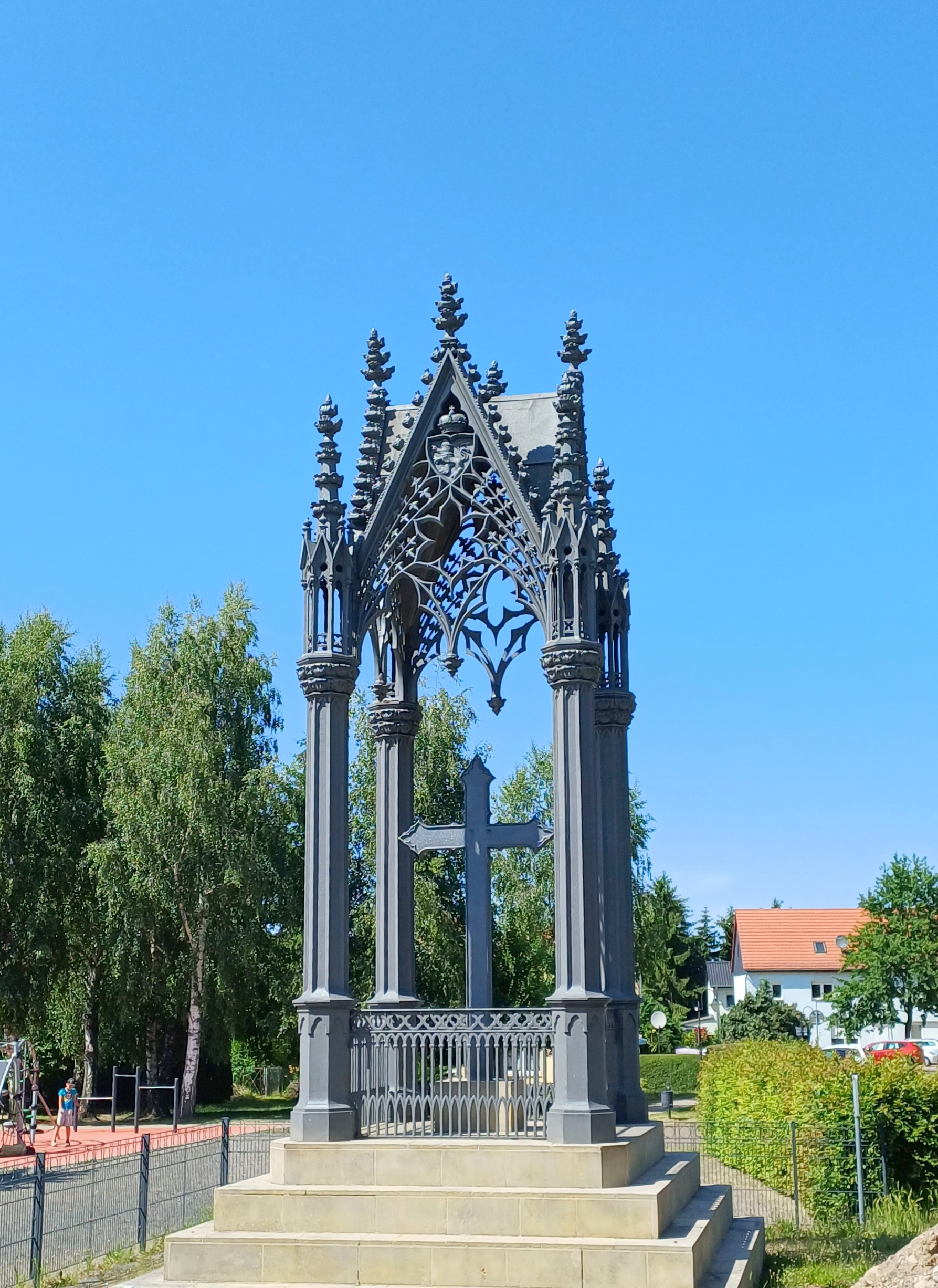
The Hesse-Homburg Monument at Großgörschen

Leopold fell at the head of the Prussian Guard at Großgörschen – his adjutant Ernst August Moritz von Froelich heard his last words as "Don't leave me under the French!". Von Froelich recovered his body and got it back to Leopold's sister Marianne. She erected a simple iron monument to him, whose inscription translates as "Here lies Prince Leopold of Hesse-Homburg. [Killed] 2 May 1813". She also set up a monument near the battle site, known as the Hesse-Homburg Monument. The street of Leopoldsweg in Bad Homburg is named after him, whilst the Gothic House there held an exhibition on the bicentenary of his death from 1 May to 28 August 2013.
