= Mühlingen =

- Municipality
- Coat of arms

- Location of Mühlingen within Konstanz district
- Interactive map of Mühlingen
- Location within Germany Location within Baden-Württemberg
- Coordinates: 47°54′44″N 09°01′02″E
- Country: Germany
- State: Baden-Württemberg
- Admin. region: Freiburg
- District: Konstanz

Government
  - Mayor (2020–28): Torsten Scigliano

Area
  - Total: 32.67 km^{2} (12.61 sq mi)
- Elevation: 625 m (2,051 ft)

Population (2025-12-31)
  - Total: 2,765
  - Density: 84.63/km^{2} (219.2/sq mi)
- Time zone: UTC+01:00 (CET)
  - Summer (DST): UTC+02:00 (CEST)
- Postal codes: 78357
- Dialling codes: 07775
- Vehicle registration: KN
- Website: www.muehlingen.de

Mühlingen (German pronunciation: [ˈmyːlɪŋən]) is a town in the district of Konstanz in Baden-Württemberg in Germany.

== Demographics ==
Population development:

| Year | Inhabitants |
|---|---|
| 1990 | 1,835 |
| 2001 | 2,284 |
| 2011 | 2,287 |
| 2021 | 2,666 |
