= Ernst Heinrich Kneschke =

German writer (1798–1869)

Ernst Heinrich Kneschke (born 27 August 1798 in Zittau; died 2 December 1869 in Leipzig) was a German heraldist, ophthalmologist and writer.

== Life ==
Ernst Heinrich Kneschke was the second son of Johann Gottfried Kneschke (1766–1825), who was Co-rector of Zittau Gymnasium and librarian of the council library, and his wife Juliana Therese Kühn (died 1802). On 10 May 1817, Kneschke enrolled at the University of Leipzig and on 24 September 1828 he graduated with the medical baccalaureate. On 29 October 1828 he received the licentiate (teaching certificate). He achieved the promotion for medicine from Leipzig in 1828 for his thesis entitled De hydrothorace. In 1828 he achieved his habilitation and he continued to teach courses until his death in December 1869. from 1843 he was extraordinary professor of ophthalmology.

Kneschke pursued history and genealogy on the side; in particular, he is known for the nine-volume Neues allgemeines deutsches Adels-Lexicon (Leipzig 1859–1870) which is an important genealogical resource and has been reprinted several times. When he died the University of Leipzig celebrated him as "a highly treasured ophthalmologist, who later turned increasingly to encyclopedic and literary pursuits."

Kneschke was actively involved in the foundation and operation of the Verein für die Geschichte Leipzigs (Society for the History of Leipzig).

Various writings by Kneschke are kept in the Universitätsbibliothek Leipzig.

== Selected works ==
- Deutsche Grafen-Häuser der Gegenwart in heraldischer, historischer und genealogischer Beziehung.
  - Band 1: A−K. T.O. Weigel, Leipzig 1852.(Volltext)
  - Band 2: L–Z. T.O. Weigel, Leipzig 1853 (Volltext)
  - Band 3: A–Z. T.O. Weigel, Leipzig 1854 (Volltext)
- Die Wappen der deutschen freiherrlichen und adeligen Familien in genauer, vollständiger und allgemein verständlicher Beschreibung. Mit geschichtlichen und urkundlichen Nachweisen.
  - Band 1. T.O. Weigel, Leipzig 1855 (Volltext).
  - Band 2. T.O. Weigel, Leipzig 1855 (Volltext).
  - Band 3. T.O. Weigel, Leipzig 1856 (Volltext).
  - Band 4. T.O. Weigel, Leipzig 1857 (Volltext).
- (Hrsg.): Neues allgemeines deutsches Adels-Lexicon. Neun Bände. Friedrich Voigt, Leipzig 1859–1870.

== Bibliography ==
- L.E.: "Johann Gottfried Kneschke, Doctor der Philosophie, Conrector am Gymnasium und Bibliothekar der Rathsbibliothek in Zittau." Neuer Nekrolog der Deutschen. (1825), 1. Part. Bernhard Friedrich Voigt, Ilmenau 1827, pp. 547–566 (Volltext).
- Bruno Stübel: Ernst Heinrich Kneschke. In: Allgemeine Encyclopädie der Wissenschaften und Künste. 2. Section, 37. Theil. Brockhaus, Leipzig 1885, p. 292 (Volltext).
- Kurt Wensch: Die Abstammung des Adels-Historikers Ernst Heinrich Kneschke. In: Mitteldeutsche Familienkunde. Vol. 33, 1992, Part 2, pp. 267–269.
