= Neues allgemeines deutsches Adels-Lexicon =

Historical reference work

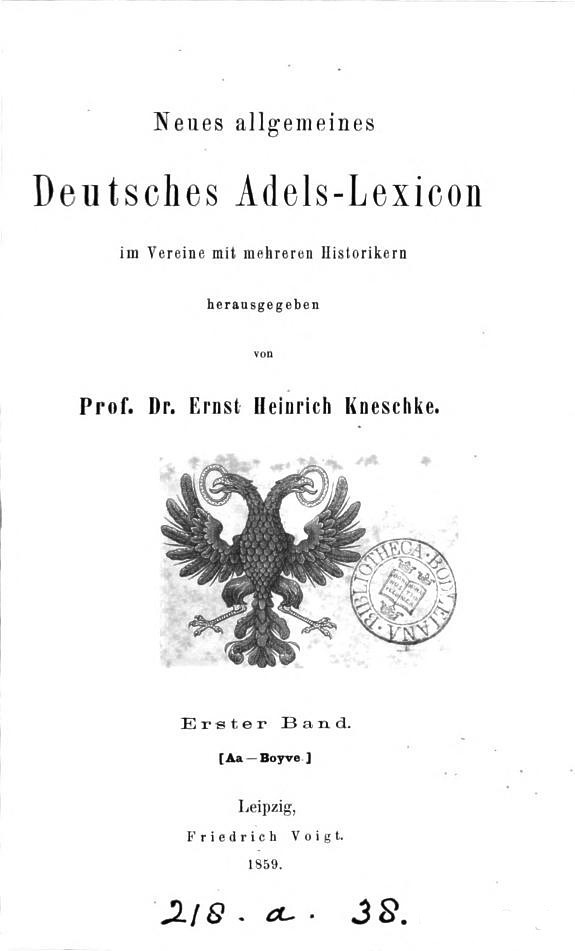
Neues allgemeines Deutsches Adels-Lexicon

Neues allgemeines Deutsches Adels-Lexicon or New General German Aristocracy Lexicon is the title of a series of historical reference books written by Professor Dr. Ernst Heinrich Kneschke about the German aristocracy, including royalty and nobility. This series is one of the most inclusive source of the German Aristocracy.

The families are listed alphabetically by surname. Each listing includes the origin of the family, the master seat, sometimes family coats of arms, fundamentals of family history and prominent members.

Wikisource: Neues allgemeines Deutsches Adels-Lexicon: Volumes I - IX

Google Books: Deutsches Adels-Lexicon German Nobility Lexicon

Verlag Friedrich Voigt, Leipzig 1859 - 1870

ISBN 3-487-04550-8, ISBN 978-3-487-04550-4
