= Gothic House (Bad Homburg) =

Heritage site in Germany

Coordinates: 50°14′3″N 8°34′29″E

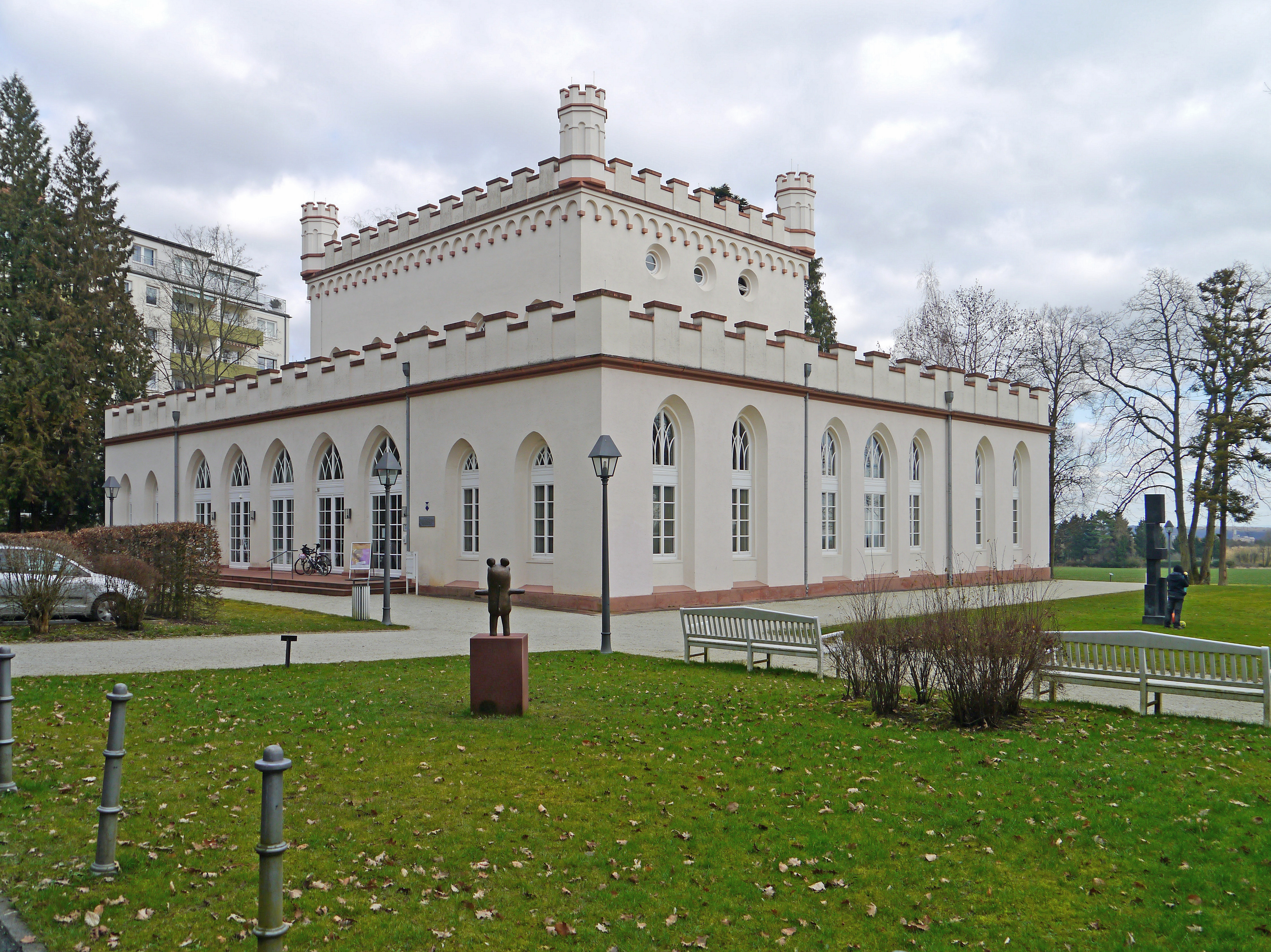
The Gothic House from the north-west

The Gothic House (Gotisches Haus) is a jagdschloss (hunting lodge) in the Dornholzhausen district of Bad Homburg, Hesse, Germany. It lies just within the town boundary and at the end of the Tannenwaldallee, which forms a direct link between Bad Homburg Castle and the Gothic House.

== History ==
=== Origins ===
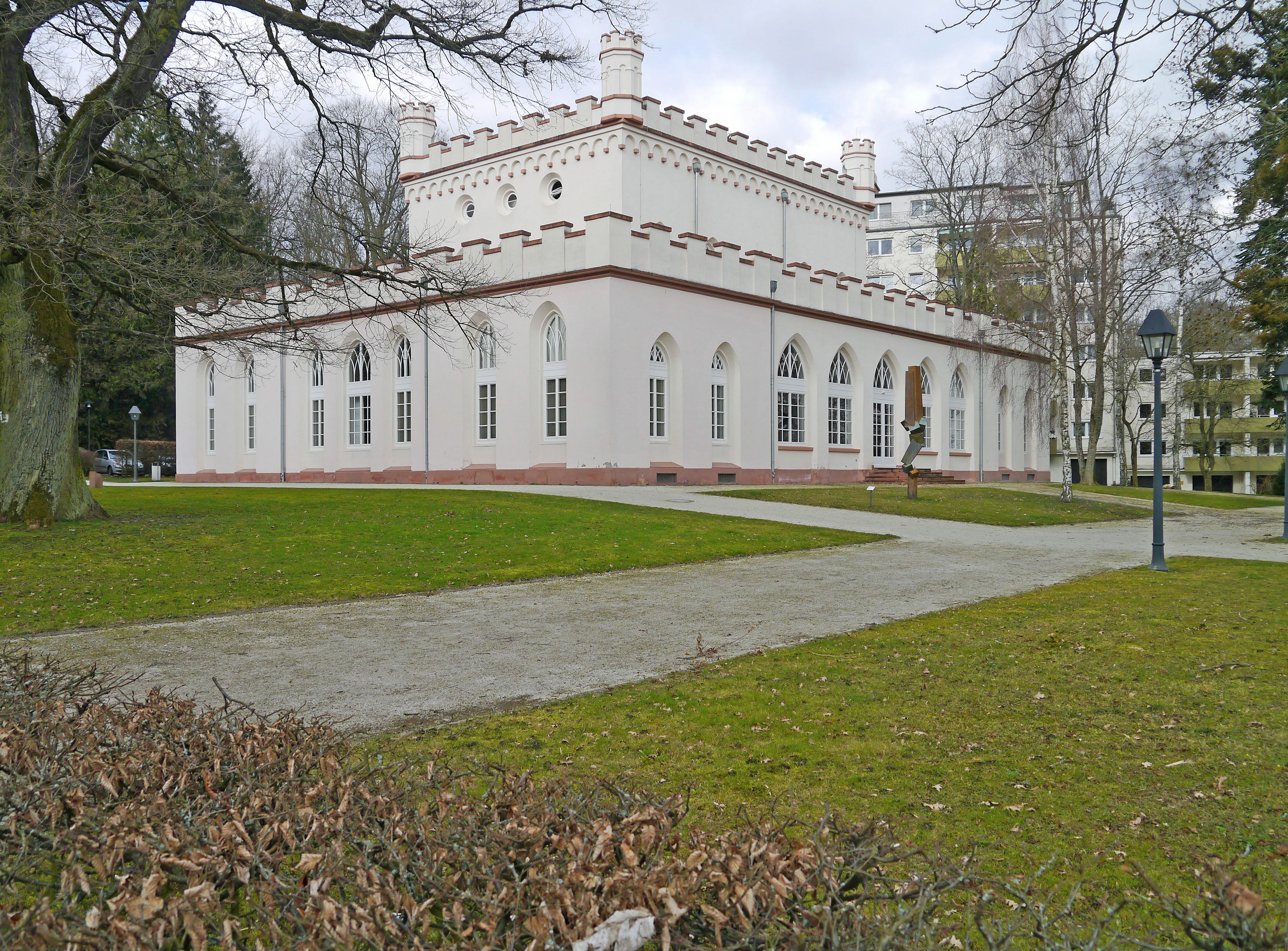
View from the south-west

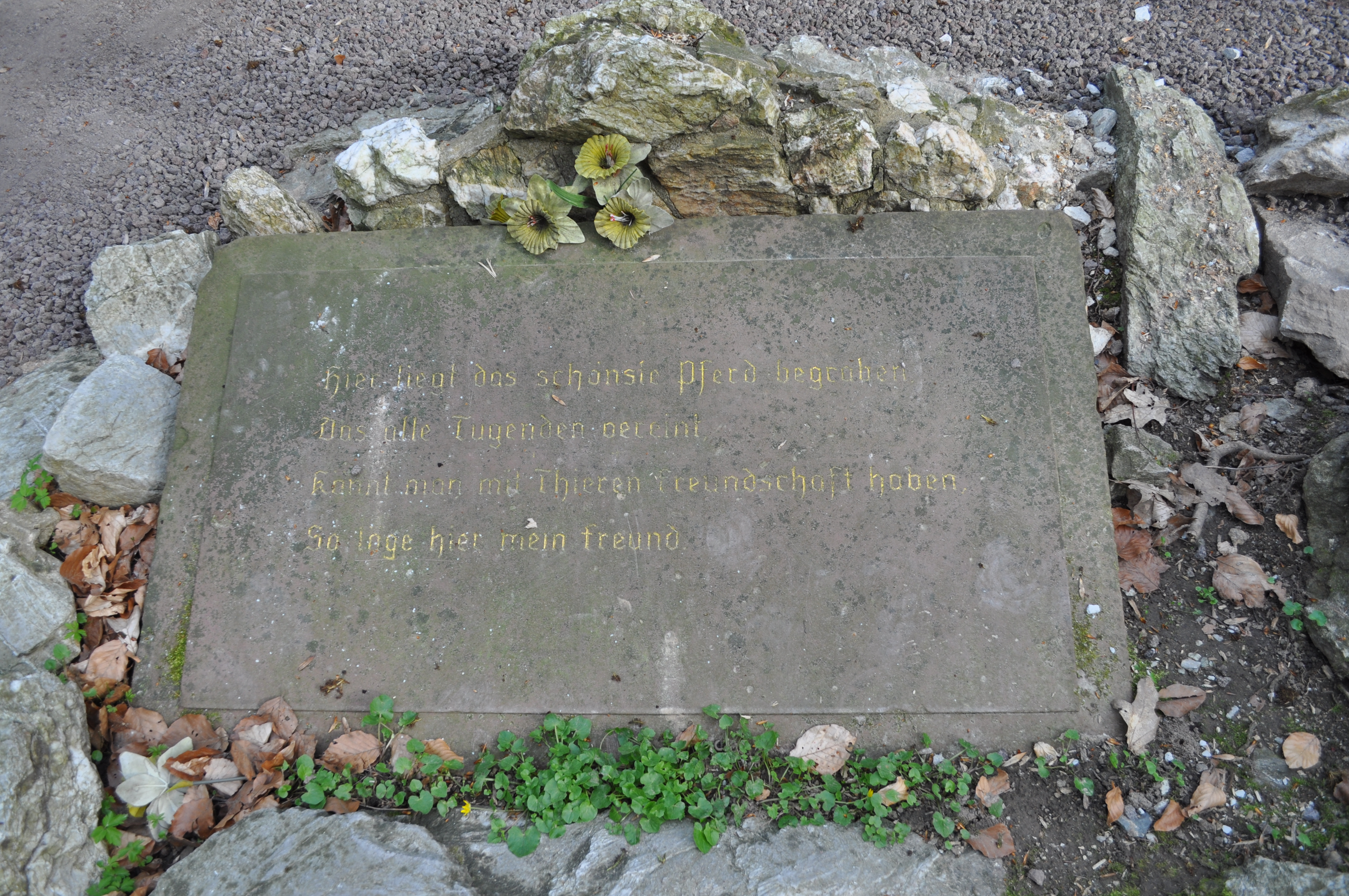
Horse grave

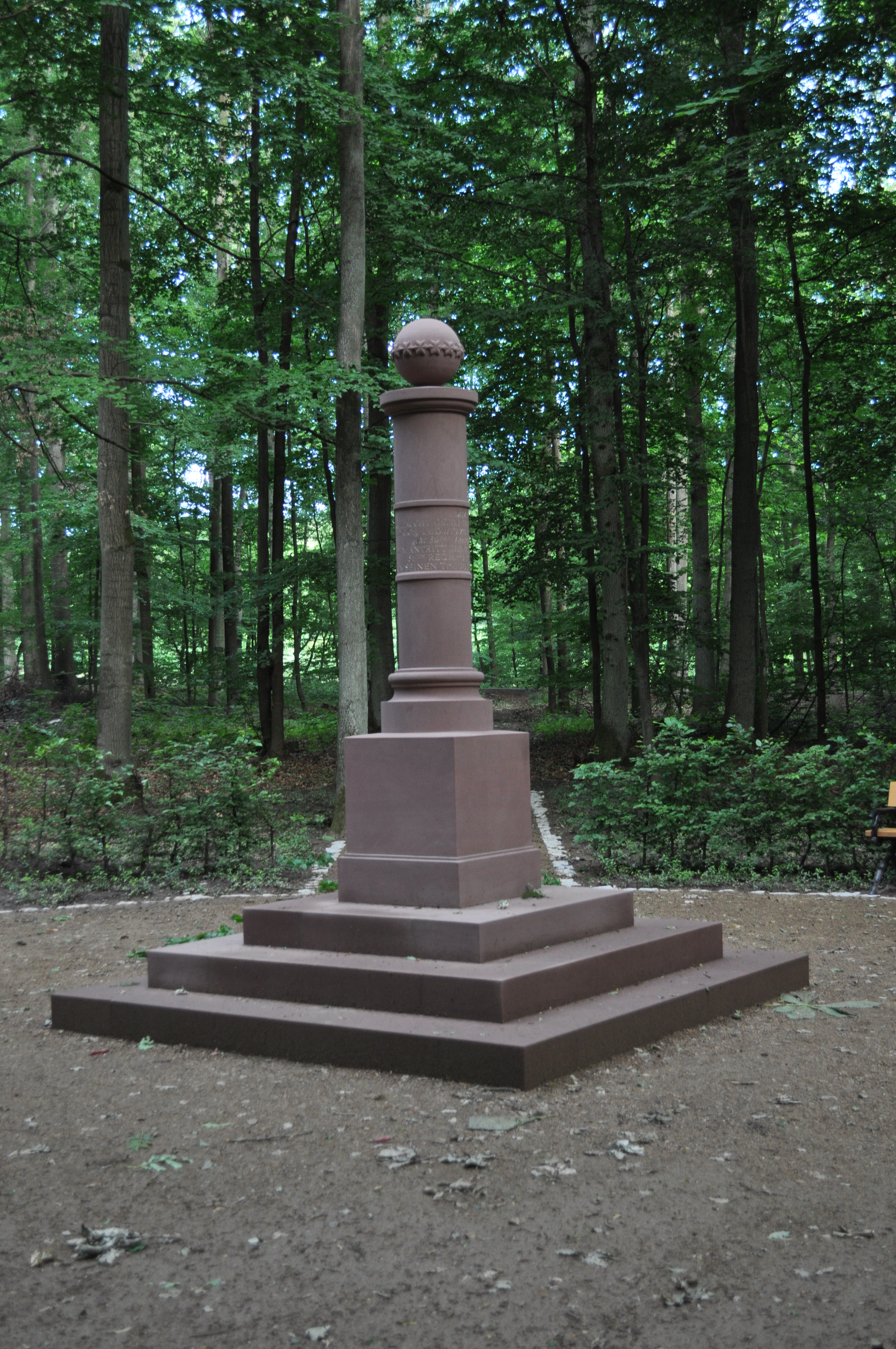
The replica column

The Gothic House was built in the castle's grounds in 1823 by Landgräfin Elisabeth, daughter of George III of the United Kingdom, for her husband Frederick VI, Landgrave of Hesse-Homburg. The foundation stone was laid on 17 April that year. She funded it using her dowry and sited it in an ideal location for Frederick to host festivities and excursions. It was also sited about 100 metres south of the grave of Frederick's horse Madjar. The Landgrave had esteemed Madjar so much that he had him formally buried in 1773 and wrote a poem for the bronze plaque marking the site, which translates:

Here lies buried the finest horse

That combined all the virtues.
If one can have friendship with animals,

Here lies my friend.

Also nearby was the Landgrafensäule ('Landgraf column'), erected in 1816 on what later became the visual axis from the Gothic House to the Elisabethenschneise, which in turn leads to the Hirschgarten. The original column was moved to the castle in 1835, but a replica was built near its site in 2011. The replica and original both bear an inscription, which translates as:

To the thoroughbred gentleman

Frederick Louis, Landgrave of Hesse-Homburg
on 30th January 1816
[erected] on the occasion of his 69th year
[and] the 51st year of his reign

by his faithful subjects

In the early Strawberry Hill variant of Gothic Revival architecture, the Gothic House's designer is unknown, but Friedrich Lotz argues it was Jeffry Wyatville, who had designed the remodelling of Windsor Castle for Elizabeth's elder brother George IV of the United Kingdom. Jeffry's uncle James Wyatt had also worked in the Gothic Revival style at Windsor and at the Castellated Palace at Kew for George and Elizabeth's father George III. Construction was overseen by Georg Moller, but was stopped permanently after scaffolding collapsed on 9 November 1823, burying and injuring eight workers, one of whom later died of his injuries.

=== 1860-1945 ===
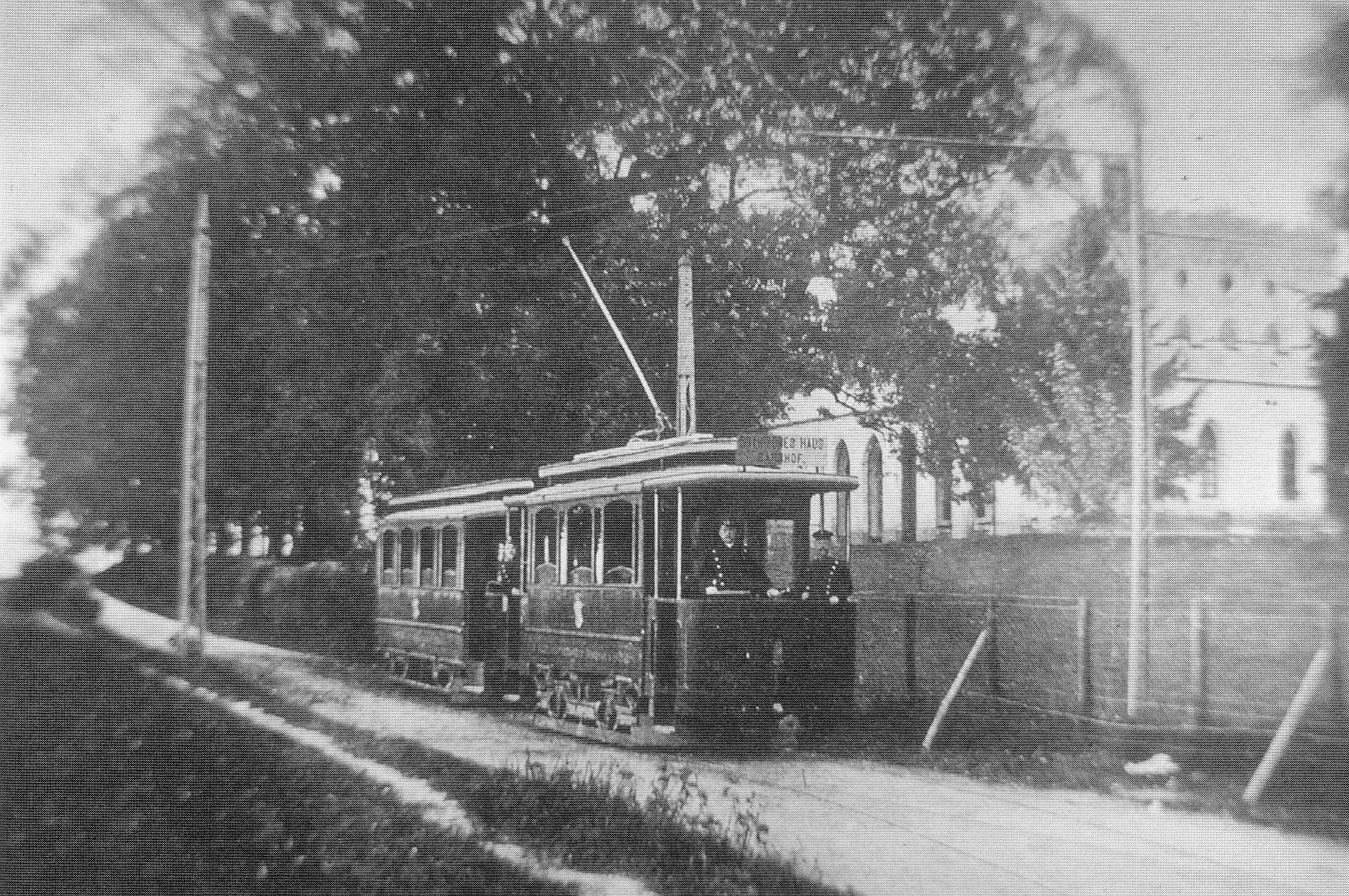
A tram at the Gothic House, c.1900

In 1860 it became part of the Forstverwaltung of the landgraviate, though that body only used eight of its rooms, with the others left available for visitors and renting. Hesse-Homburg was annexed by the Kingdom of Prussia in 1866 after the Austro-Prussian War; for a while the Gothic House's use remained the same as before, though some rooms were taken on for use by the Prussian court. Wilhelm II of Prussia sold it to a restaurant owner but still wanted it "secure as a monument", for reasons that remain unclear. In 1929 the new owner turned it into a hotel, restaurant and café. It became a popular attraction and from 1899 to 1923 was a stop on the town's tram network.

=== 1945 onwards ===
After World War II the house went through several changes of owner, sending it into a slow decline. At one point it housed the "Ponderosa Saloon" disco. The site was sold in 1968 by the Obertaunuskreis district of Hesse to Jan Lipinski, a property speculator from Frankfurt. Two seven-storey tower blocks were built near the Haus to house the staff for a planned hotel that never came to fruition. The Gothic House was listed as a historic monument in 1977 "at the last minute" and in 1980 the building passed to a property management company in Frankfurt after the Lipinskis went bankrupt. The Gothic House suffered a fire on 9 December 1980 and was completely restored from 1981 onwards. Since 1985 it has housed the town's archive and its cultural history museum. (The museum was founded in 1916 but was previously sited elsewhere.)

== Gallery ==
The museum houses many temporary exhibitions and permanent displays on the history, art, fashion, coinage and hat-industry of the town, its spa and the landgraviate as a whole, including the "Hutmuseum", centred on the Homburg hat. The Gothic House now also houses the museum café.

=== Main museum ===
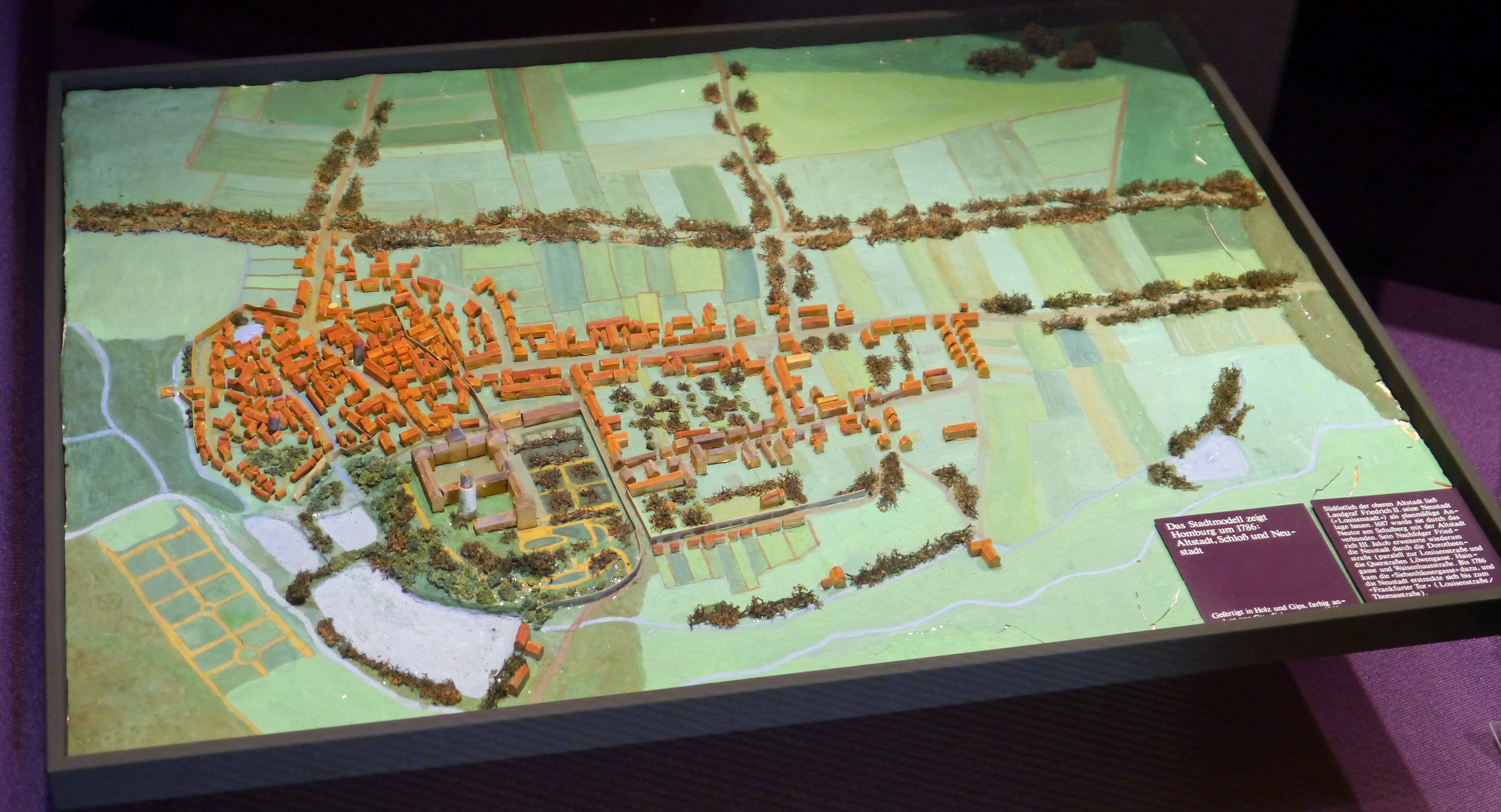
Model of Homburg in 1786

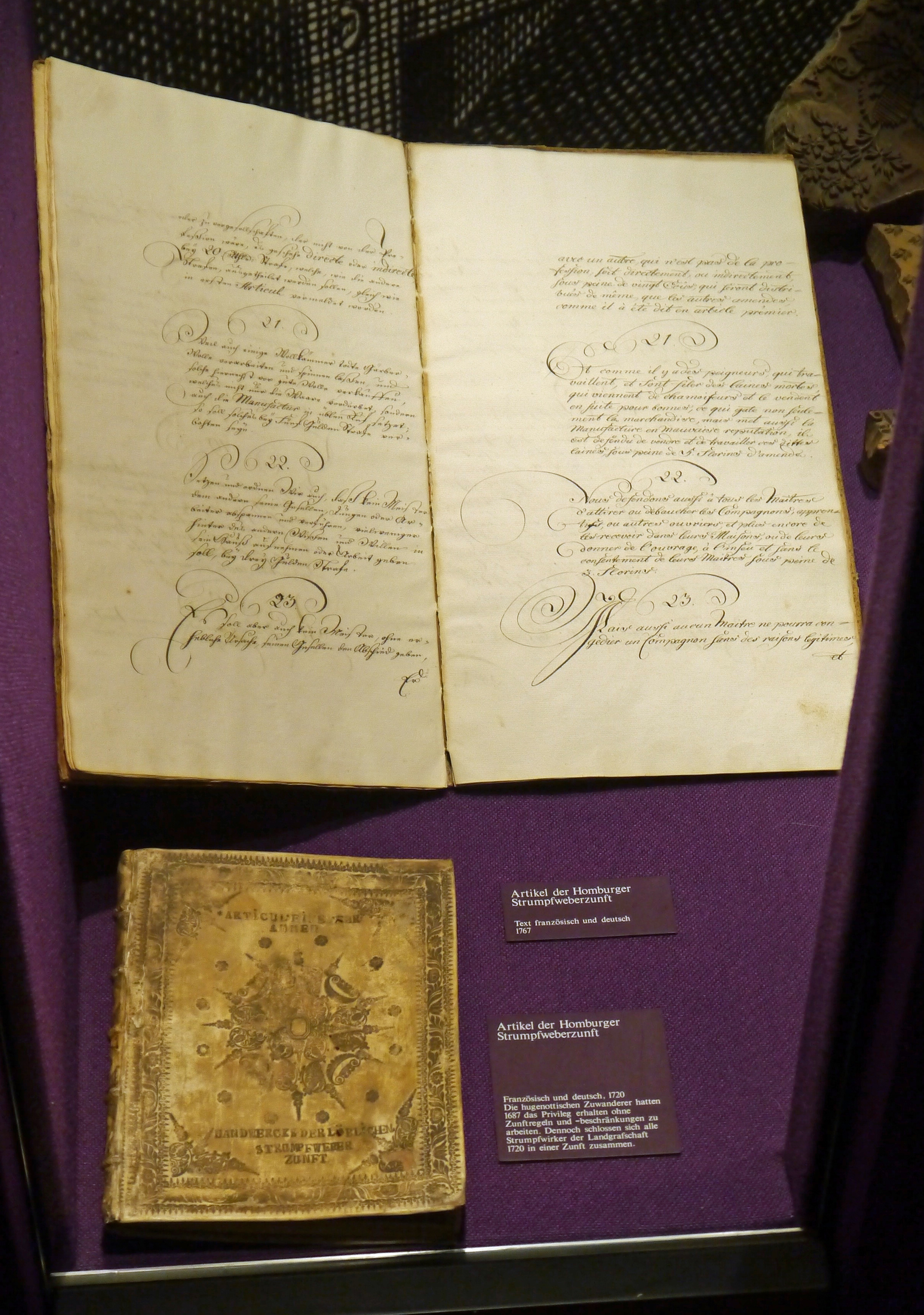
Documents on 18th century stockings

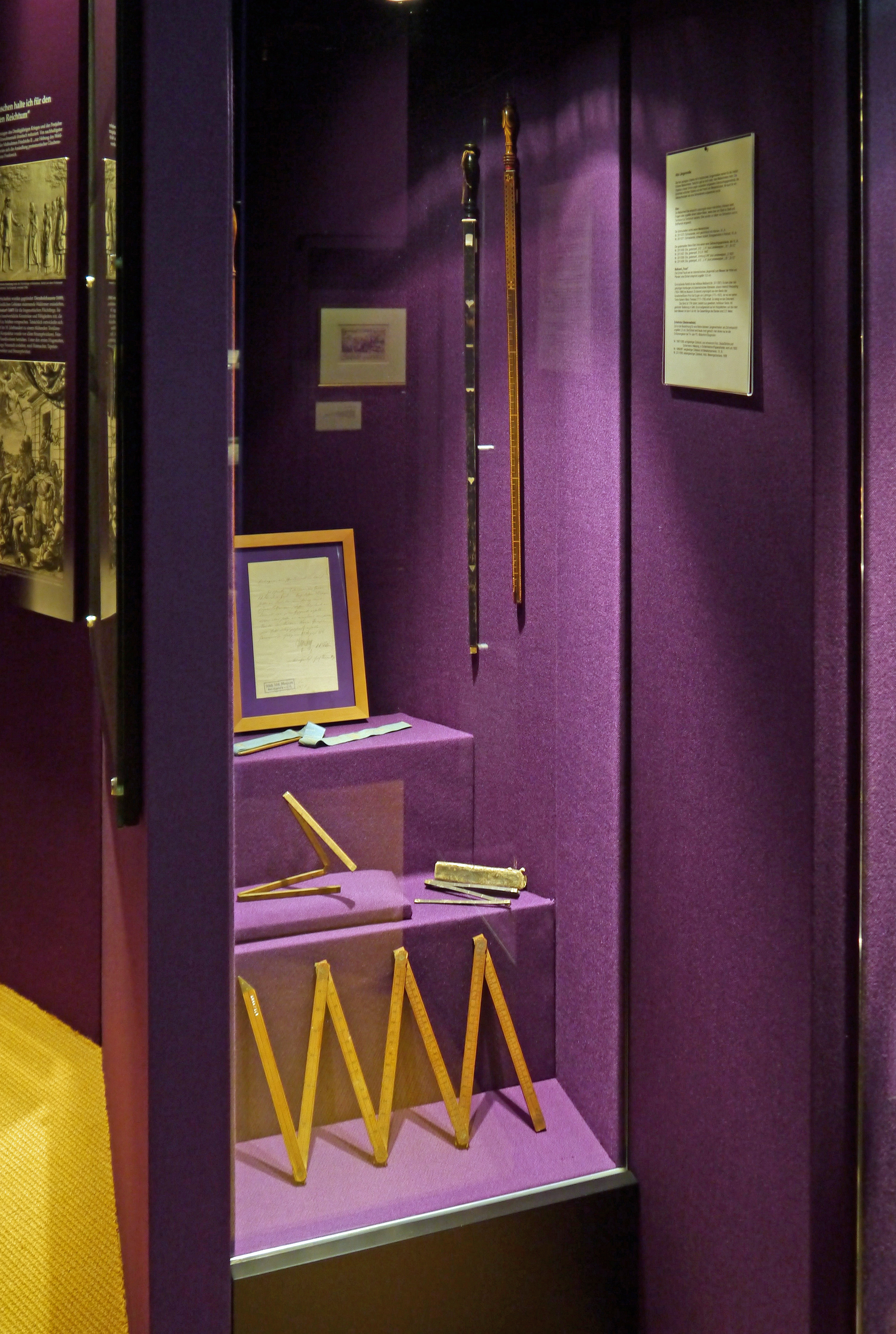
Objects

=== Romantic-period room ===
The Romantik-Zimmer was set up as a period room to display furniture, decorative pieces and paintings from the period in 2012.

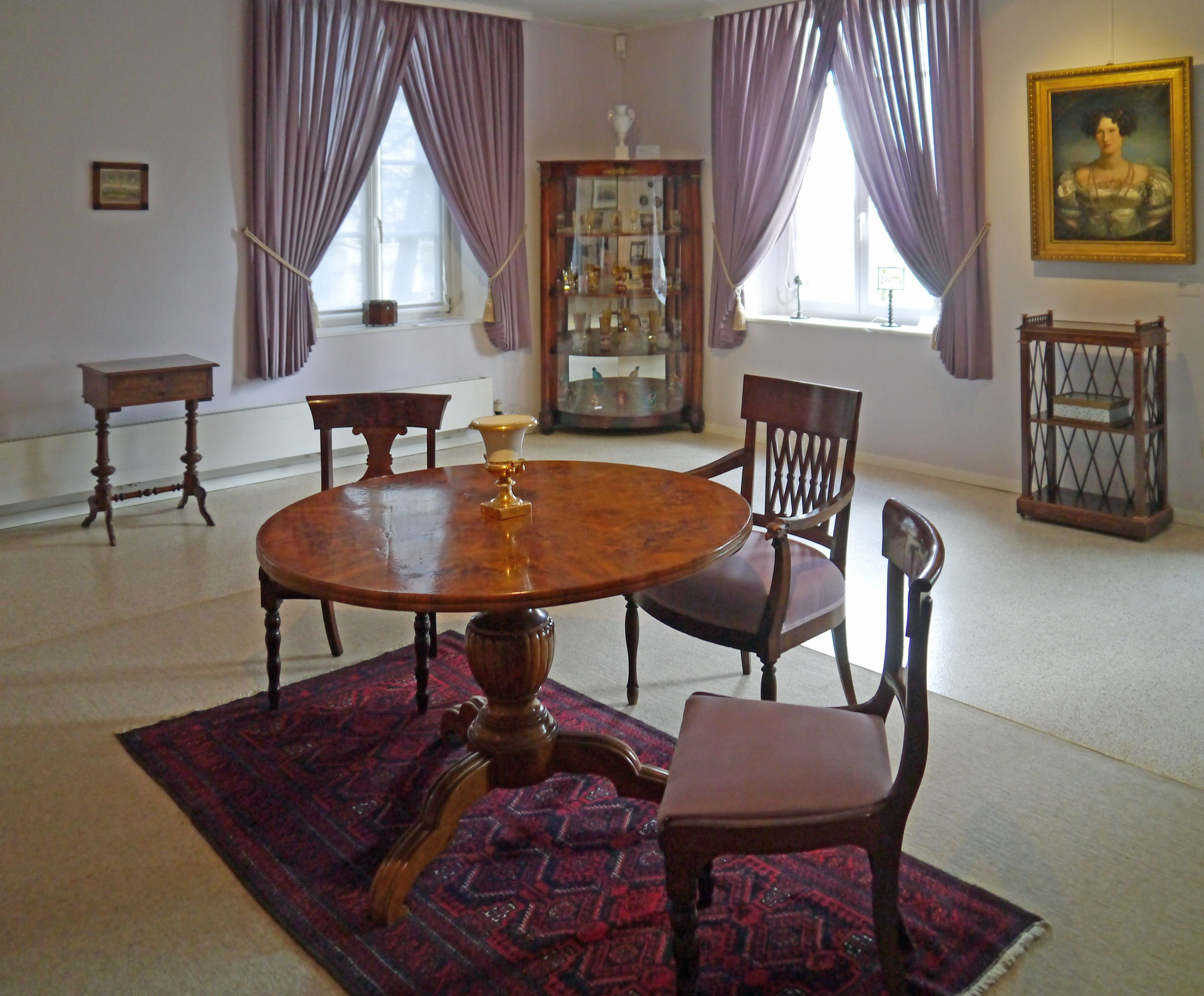
View

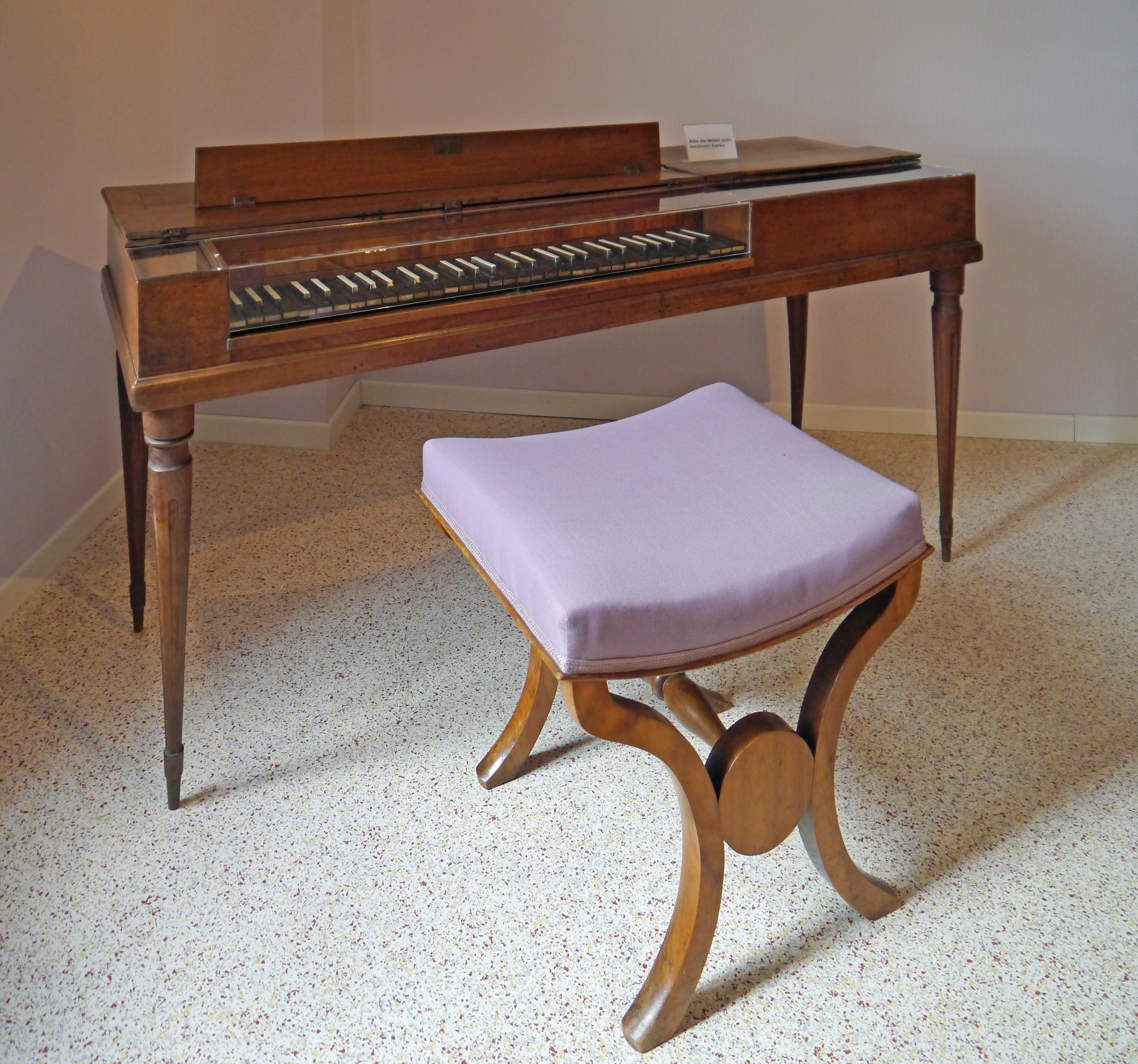
1799 table-piano

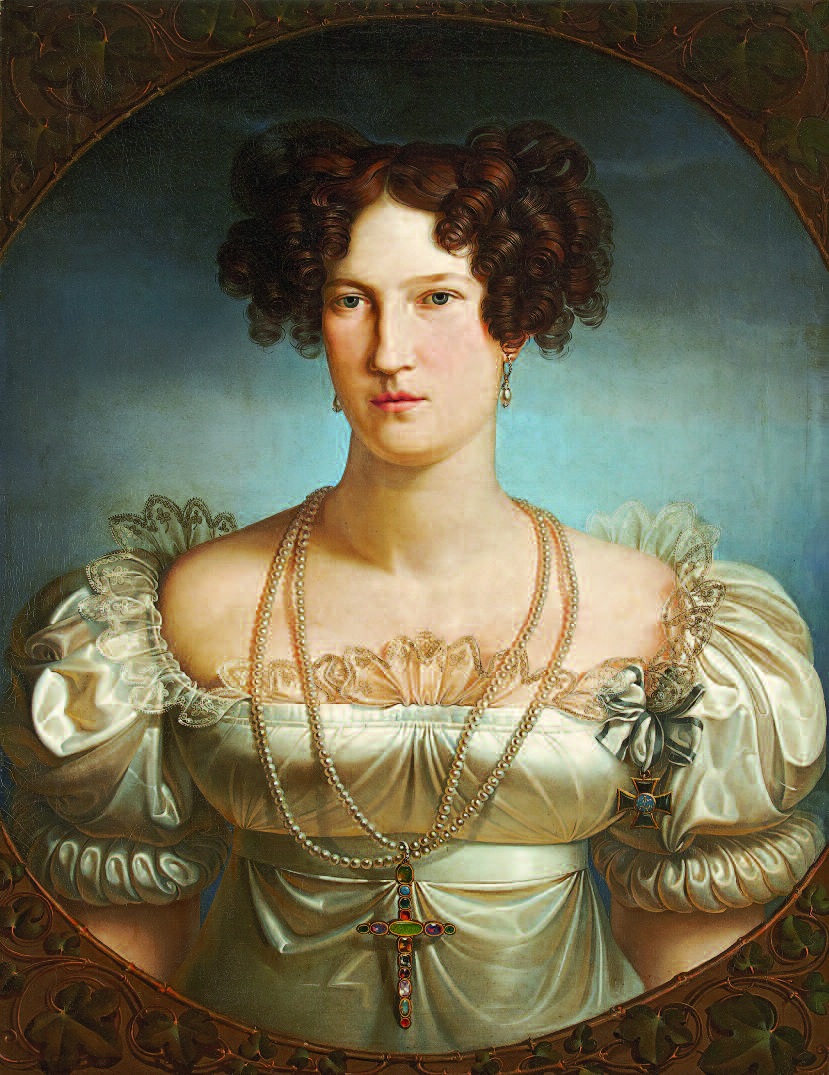
Princess Marianne of Prussia (1830)

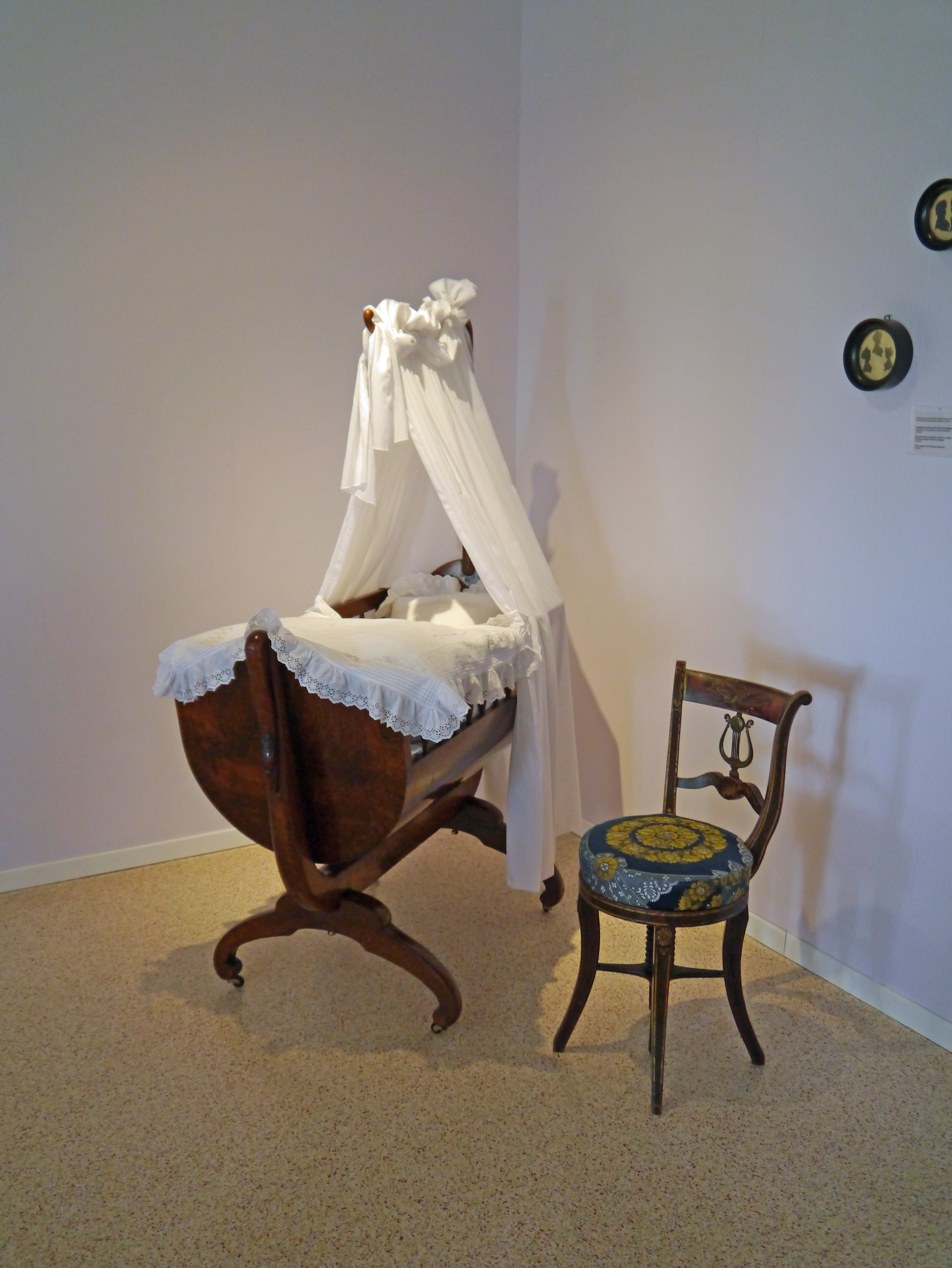
Cradle and stool

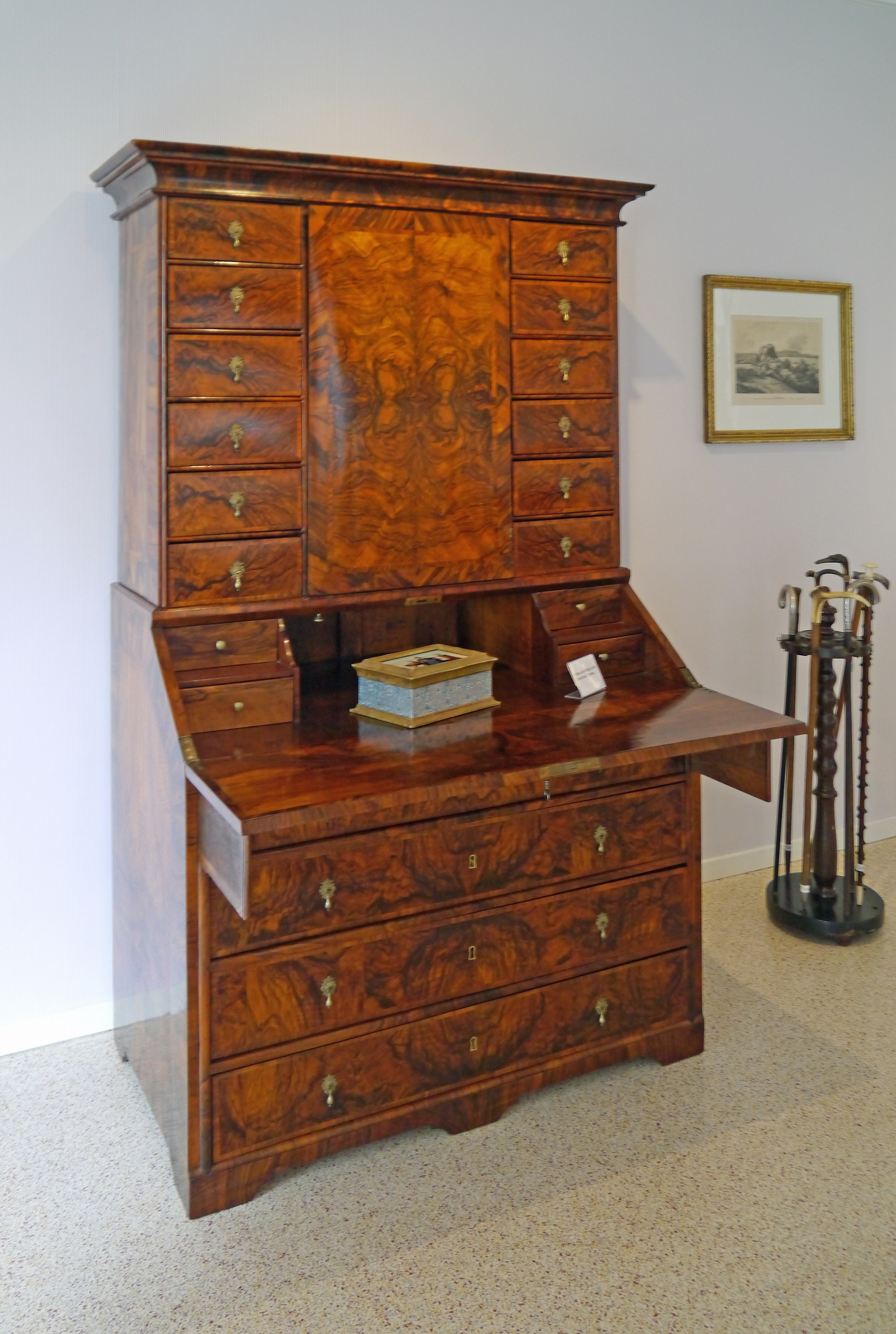
1780 writing desk

=== Hutmuseum ===
This display on millinery records the town's importance to the hat industry and its worldwide fame as the originatory of the Homburg, made popular by the Prince of Wales (the future Edward VII) and made in the Möckel factory in the town from the 1880s onwards.

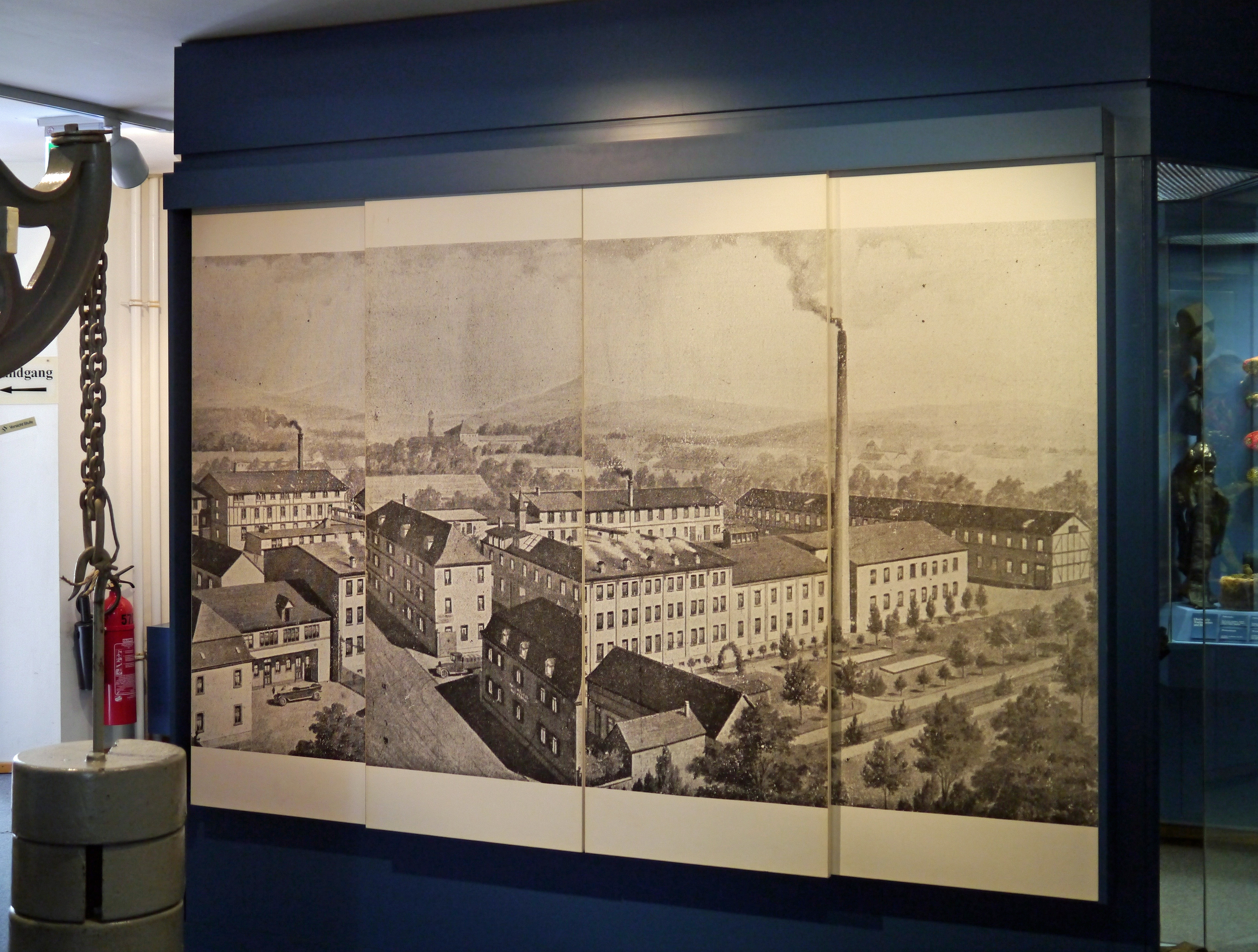
The Möckel hat factory

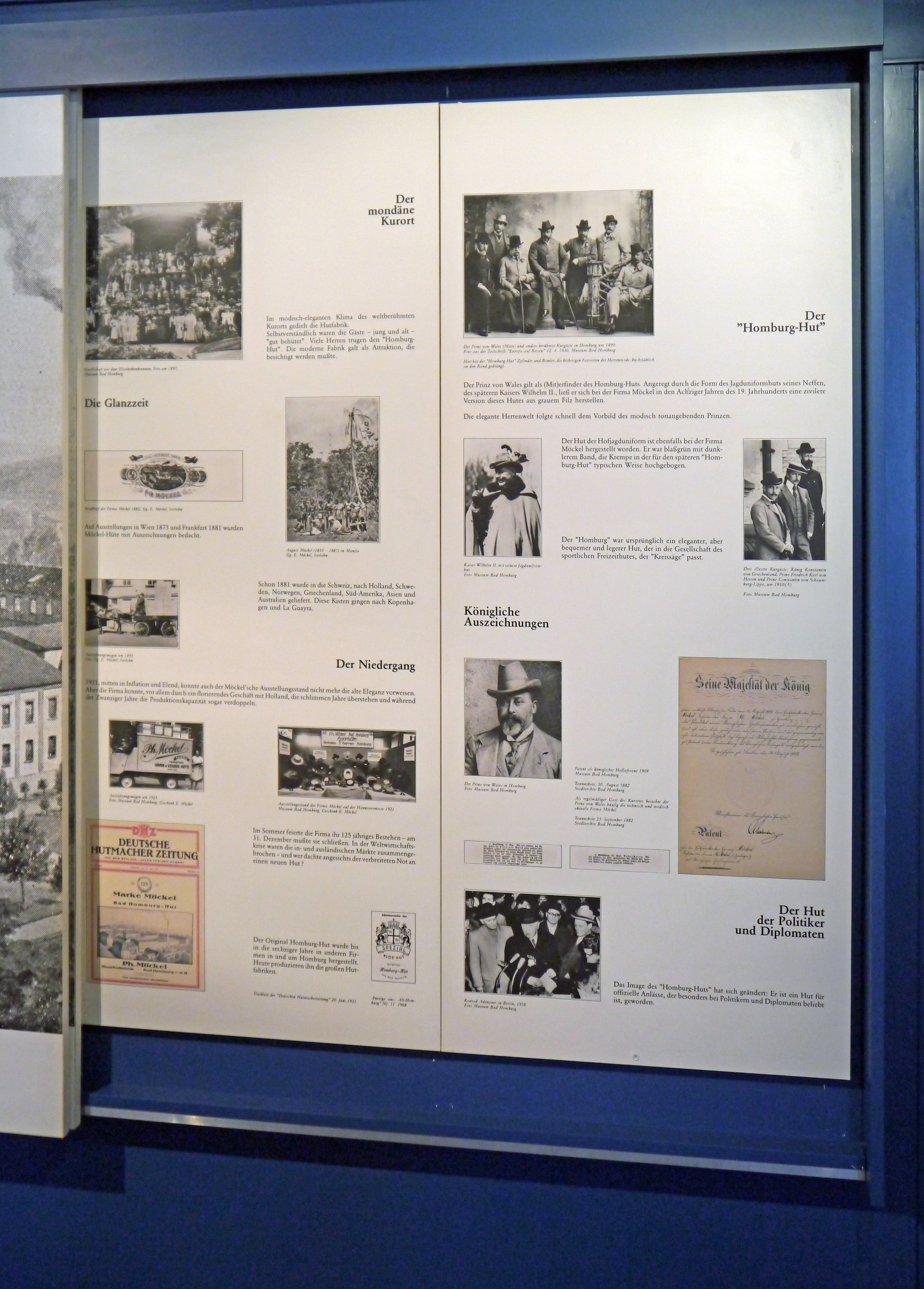
Development of the Homburg

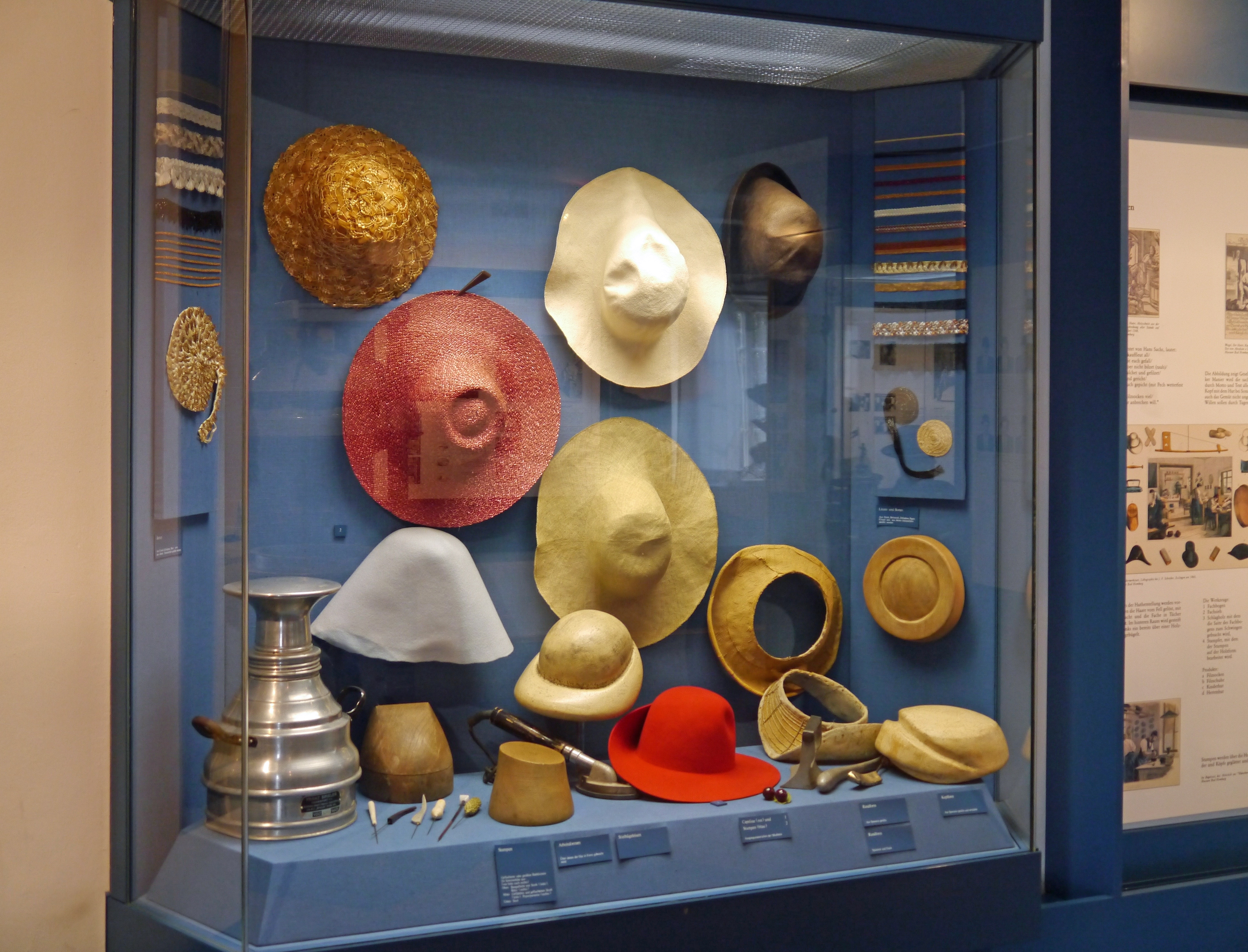
Tools, half-finished items and stages in hat production

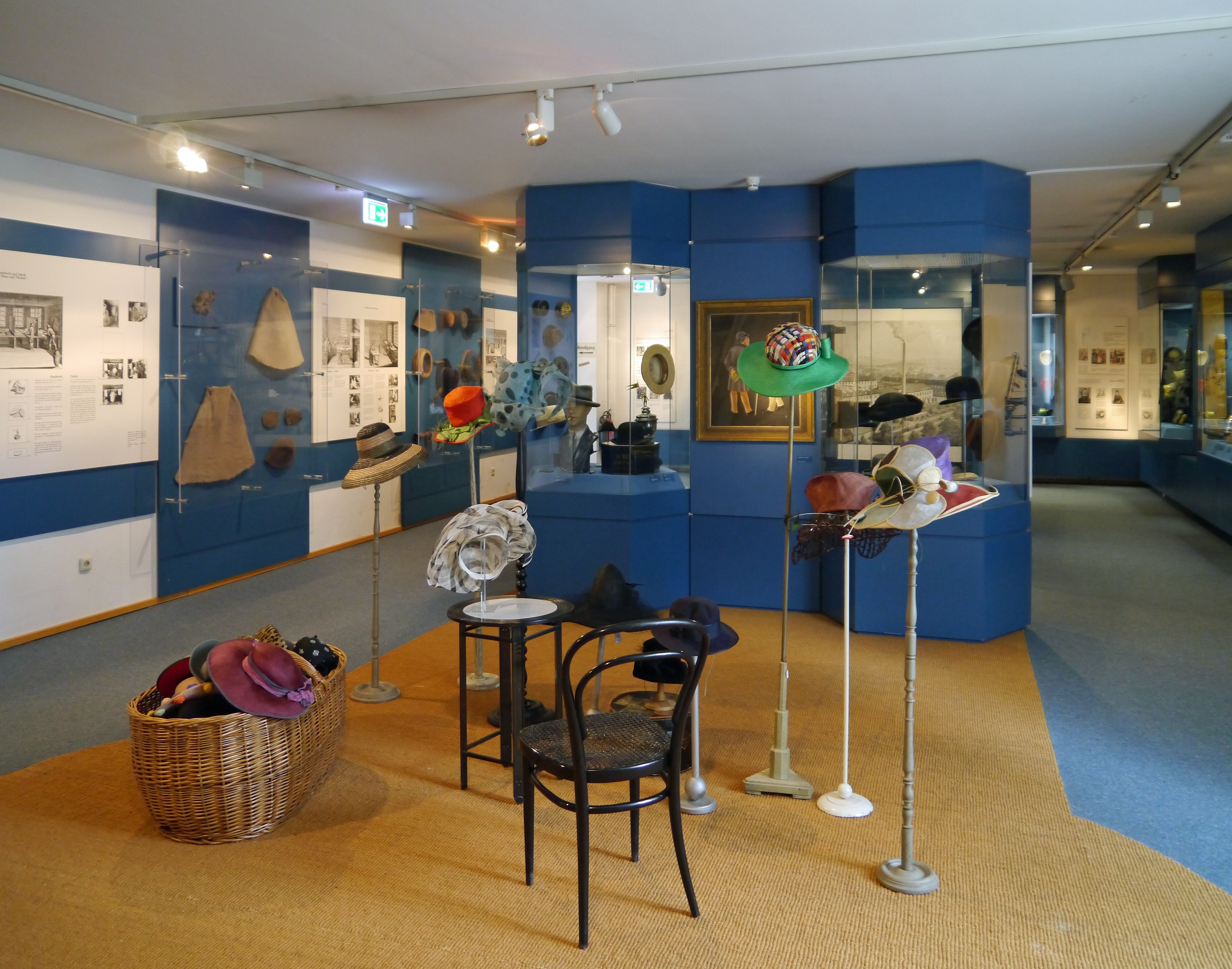
Display area

=== Sculpture garden ===
Image	Sculptor	Title	Year	Notes
	Hans Steinbrenner	"Figur"	2005	
	Hartmut Stielow	"Ohne Titel"(Untitled)	1997	Part of the first Blickachsen exhibition
	Bruce Beasley	"Spokesman II"	1994	Image shows it at its former site on Ferdinandsplatz
	Isolde Schmitt-Menzel	Maus	2013	Bronze

== Bibliography (in German) ==
- Friedrich Lotz: Geschichte der Stadt Bad Homburg vor der Höhe. Band 2: Die Landgrafenzeit. Kramer, Frankfurt am Main 1972, ISBN 3-7829-0133-9, S. 246–247.
- Gerta Walsh: Das Gotische Haus entstand neu wie Phoenix aus der Asche. In: Taunus-Kurier. 2. März 1985, S. 15.
- Beate Datzkow: Das Gotische Haus im Großen Tannenwald zu Bad Homburg vor der Höhe. (Aus dem Stadtarchiv. Vorträge zur Bad Homburger Geschichte, Sonderband). Bad Homburg v.d.Höhe 2005, ISBN 3-928325-38-8.
