= Prince Waldemar of Prussia (1868–1879) =

German prince

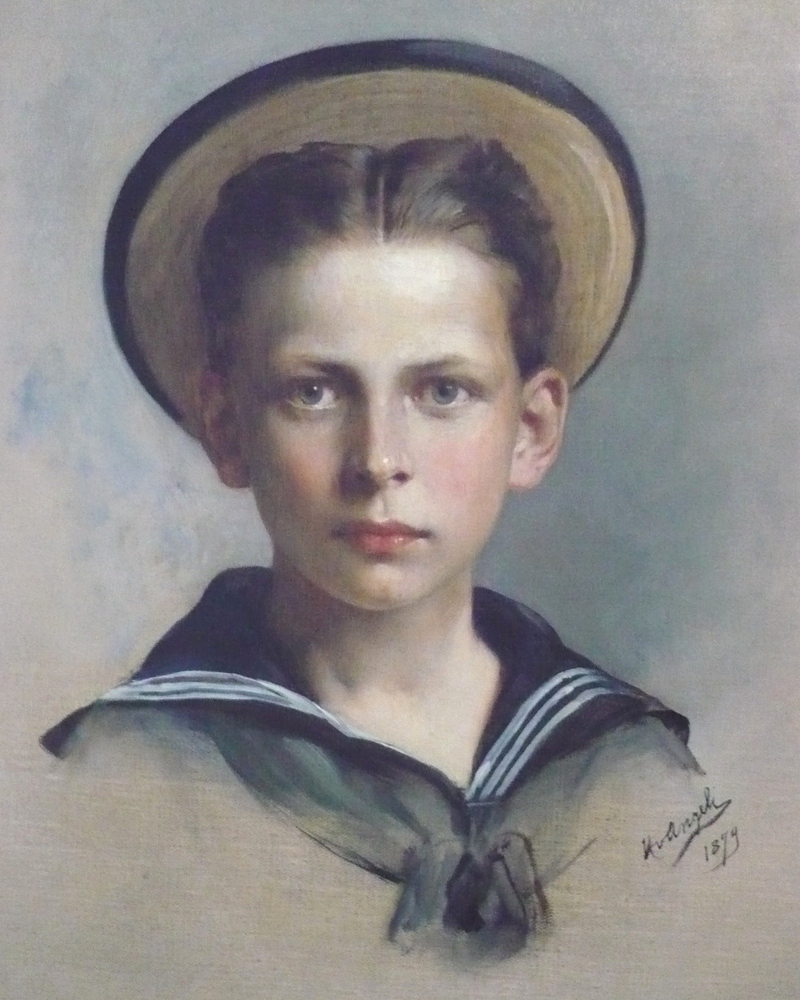
- Portrait by Heinrich von Angeli, 1879
- Born: 10 February 1868; Crown Prince's Palace, Berlin, Kingdom of Prussia
- Died: 27 March 1879 (aged 11); New Palace, Potsdam, Prussia, German Empire
- Burial: 29 March 1879; Friedenskirche, Potsdam, Prussia, German Empire
Names
- German: Joachim Friedrich Ernst Waldemar; English: Joachim Frederick Ernest Waldemar
- House: Hohenzollern
- Father: Frederick William, German Crown Prince (later Frederick III)
- Mother: Victoria, Princess Royal

Prince Waldemar of Prussia (Joachim Friedrich Ernst Waldemar; 10 February 1868 – 27 March 1879) was the sixth child and youngest son of the German Crown Prince and Crown Princess, later Emperor Frederick III and Empress Victoria. Prince Waldemar was a grandson of both German Emperor Wilhelm I, and Queen Victoria of the United Kingdom.

== Biography ==
=== Early life ===
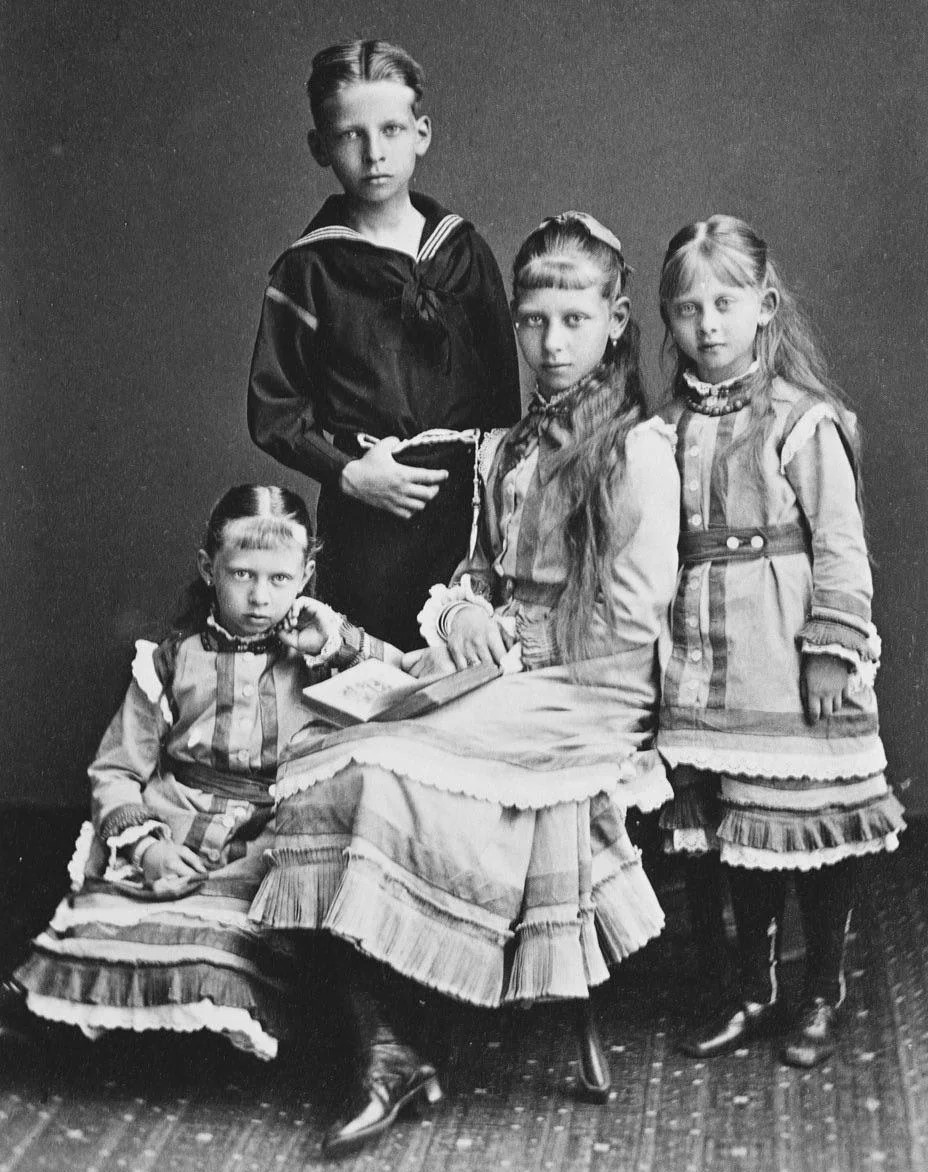
Prince Waldemar of Prussia with his sisters in June 1878

Waldemar was the favourite of both the Princess Royal and her husband. He was a lively, cheerful boy, boisterous and high-spirited, with a sensible, independent and honest nature. He was quick to learn and his mother found him a pleasure to teach. Waldemar had a "fun loving" character and a great sense of humour and love for animals and sports. On one occasion, when visiting his grandmother, Queen Victoria, Waldemar let loose his pet crocodile in her study, much to the shock of the middle-aged queen. The Princess Royal wrote that she would be unhappy when Waldemar went off to school, "as he is my very own boy." She seemed to prefer Waldemar over his elder brothers Wilhelm and Heinrich.

=== Death ===
Less than four months after the deaths of his maternal aunt, Alice, Grand Duchess of Hesse and cousin, Marie, Waldemar became seriously ill with diphtheria and died in Berlin, Germany on 27 March 1879. He was buried in the royal mausoleum attached to the Friedenskirche at Potsdam, near the main altar and his elder brother Prince Sigismund of Prussia. His parents were later buried not far away in the centre of the mausoleum directly under the dome.

== Ancestry ==
Ancestors of Prince Waldemar of Prussia (1868–1879)

8. Frederick William III of Prussia
4. Wilhelm I, German Emperor
9. Duchess Louise of Mecklenburg-Strelitz
2. Frederick III, German Emperor
10. Charles Frederick, Grand Duke of Saxe-Weimar-Eisenach
5. Princess Augusta of Saxe-Weimar-Eisenach
11. Grand Duchess Maria Pavlovna of Russia
1. Prince Waldemar of Prussia
12. Ernest I, Duke of Saxe-Coburg and Gotha
6. Prince Albert of Saxe-Coburg and Gotha
13. Princess Louise of Saxe-Gotha-Altenburg
3. Victoria, Princess Royal
14. Prince Edward, Duke of Kent and Strathearn
7. Queen Victoria of the United Kingdom
15. Princess Victoria of Saxe-Coburg-Saalfeld
