= Victoria, Princess Royal =

German Empress in 1888

Victoria
- Princess Royal
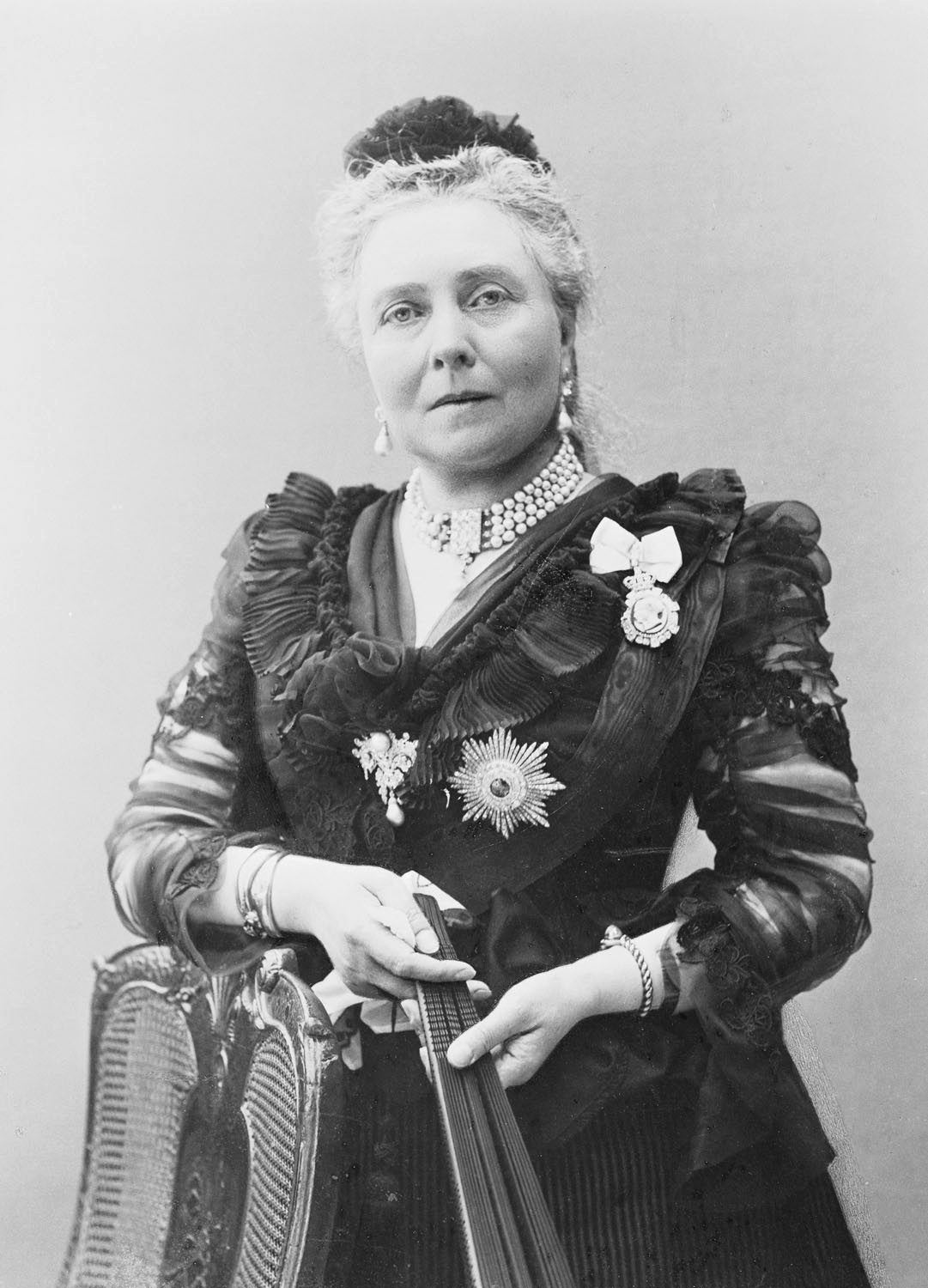
- Portrait, c. 1895–1896

German Empress consort Queen consort of Prussia
- Tenure: 9 March 1888 – 15 June 1888
- Born: 21 November 1840; Buckingham Palace, London, England
- Died: 5 August 1901 (aged 60); Schloss Friedrichshof, Cronberg, Germany
- Burial: 13 August 1901; Friedenskirche, Potsdam
- Spouse: Frederick III, German Emperor (m. 1858; died 1888)
- Issue: Wilhelm II, German Emperor; Charlotte, Duchess of Saxe-Meiningen; Prince Henry; Prince Sigismund; Viktoria, Princess Adolf of Schaumburg-Lippe; Prince Waldemar; Sophia, Queen of the Hellenes; Margaret, Landgravine of Hesse
Names
- Victoria Adelaide Mary Louisa
- House: Saxe-Coburg and Gotha
- Father: Prince Albert of Saxe-Coburg and Gotha
- Mother: Queen Victoria

Victoria, Princess Royal (Victoria Adelaide Mary Louisa; 21 November 1840 – 5 August 1901) was German Empress and Queen of Prussia as the wife of Frederick III, German Emperor. She was the eldest child of Queen Victoria of the United Kingdom and Prince Albert of Saxe-Coburg and Gotha and was created Princess Royal in 1841. As the eldest child of the British monarch, she was briefly heir presumptive until the birth of her younger brother, the future Edward VII. She was the mother of Wilhelm II, the last German Emperor.

Educated by her father in a politically liberal environment, Victoria was married at the age of 17 to Prince Frederick of Prussia, with whom she then had eight children. Victoria shared with Frederick her liberal views and hopes that Prussia and the later German Empire should become a constitutional monarchy, based on the British model. Criticised for this attitude and for her English origins, Victoria suffered ostracism by the Hohenzollerns and the Berlin court. This isolation increased after the rise to power of Chancellor Otto von Bismarck, one of her staunchest political opponents, in 1862.

Victoria was empress for only a few months, during which she had opportunity to influence the policy of the German Empire. Frederick III died in 1888, only 99 days after his accession, from laryngeal cancer. He was succeeded by their son Wilhelm II, who had much more conservative views than his parents. After her husband's death, she became widely known as Empress Frederick (German: Kaiserin Friedrich). The dowager empress then settled in Kronberg im Taunus in Hesse, where she built a castle which she named Friedrichshof, in honour of her late husband. Increasingly isolated after the weddings of her younger daughters, she died of breast cancer in August 1901, less than seven months after the death of her mother, Queen Victoria, in January 1901.

The correspondence between Victoria and her parents has been preserved almost completely: 3,777 letters from British Queen Victoria to her eldest daughter, and about 4,000 letters from the German Empress to her parents, are preserved and catalogued. These give a detailed insight into life at the Prussian court between 1858 and 1900.

== Early life and education ==
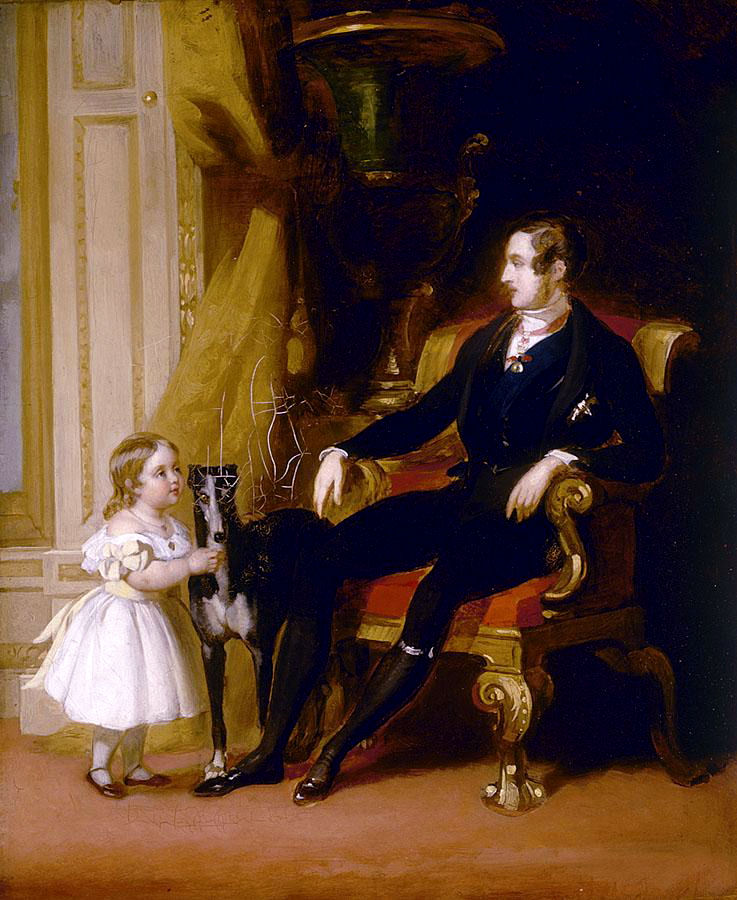
Victoria with her father Prince Albert and his greyhound Eos. Portrait by John Lucas, 1841.

Victoria was born at 1:50 pm on 21 November 1840 at Buckingham Palace, London. She was the first child of Queen Victoria and her husband, Prince Albert. When she was born, the doctor exclaimed sadly: "Oh Madame, it's a girl!" The queen replied: "Never mind, next time it will be a prince!" As a daughter of the sovereign, Victoria was born a British princess. In addition, she was heir presumptive to the British throne from her birth until the birth of her younger brother Prince Albert Edward (later King Edward VII) on 9 November 1841. On 19 January 1841, she was made Princess Royal, a title sometimes conferred on the eldest daughter of the sovereign. To her family, she was known simply as Vicky.

She was baptised in the Throne Room at Buckingham Palace on 10 February 1841 (on her parents' first wedding anniversary) by the Archbishop of Canterbury, William Howley. The Lily font was commissioned especially for the occasion of her christening.

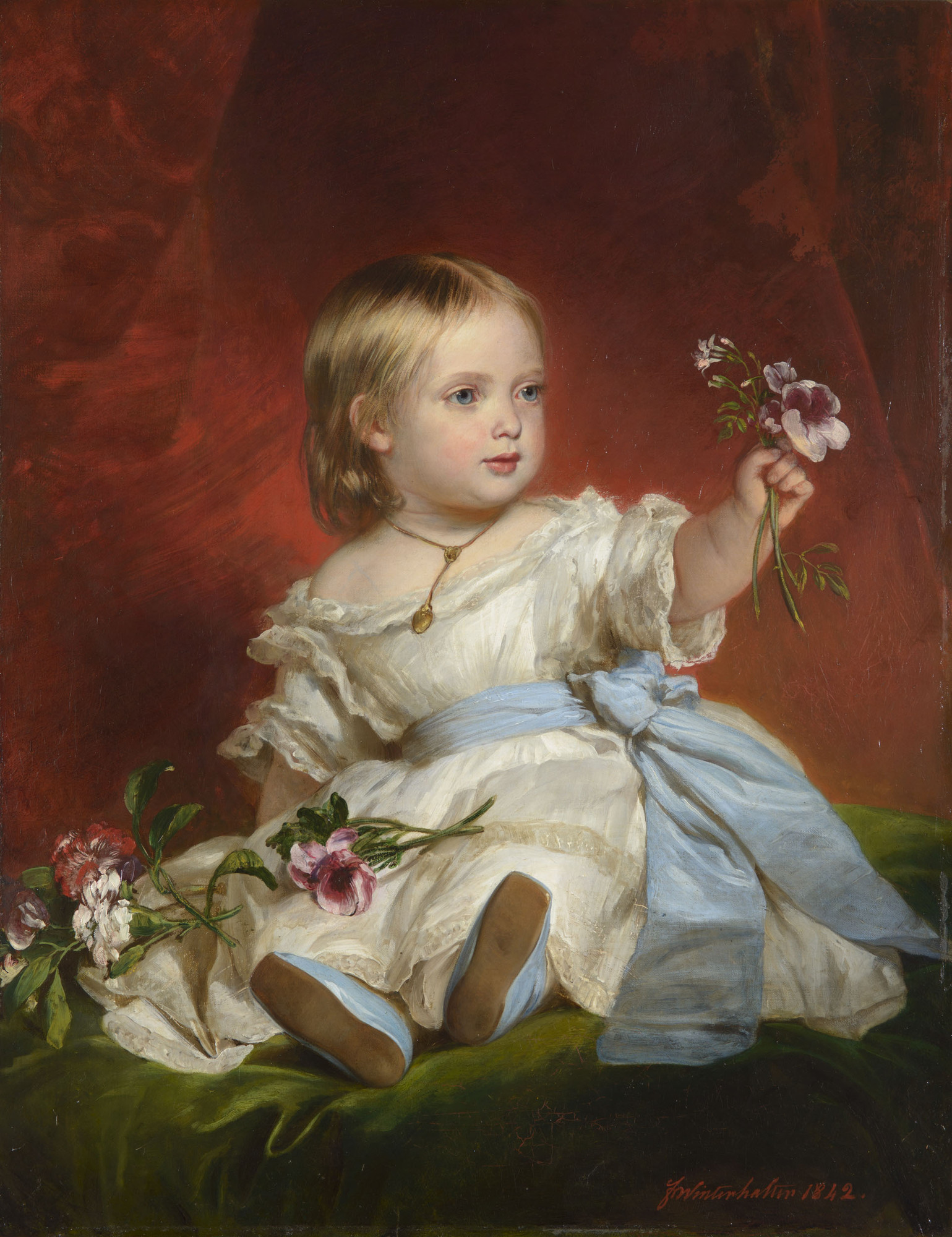
The Princess Royal as a young child. Portrait by Franz Xaver Winterhalter, 1842.

The royal couple decided to give their children as complete an education as possible. Queen Victoria, who had succeeded her uncle King William IV at the age of 18, believed that she herself had not been sufficiently prepared for government affairs. For his part Prince Albert, born in the small Duchy of Saxe-Coburg-Gotha, had received a more careful education thanks to his uncle King Leopold I of Belgium.

Shortly after the birth of Victoria, Prince Albert wrote a memoir detailing the tasks and duties of all those involved with the royal children. Another 48-page document, written a year-and-a-half later by the Baron Stockmar, an intimate of the royal couple, details the educational principles to be used with the little princess. The royal couple, however, had only a very vague idea of the proper educational development of a child. Queen Victoria, for example, believed that the fact that her baby sucked on bracelets was a sign of deficient education. According to Hannah Pakula, biographer of the future German empress, the first two governesses of the princess were therefore particularly well chosen. Experienced in dealing with children, Lady Lyttelton directed the nursery through which passed all royal children after Victoria's second year and diplomatically managed to soften the unrealistic demands of the royal couple. Sarah Anne Hildyard, the children's second governess, was a competent teacher who quickly developed a close relationship with her pupils.

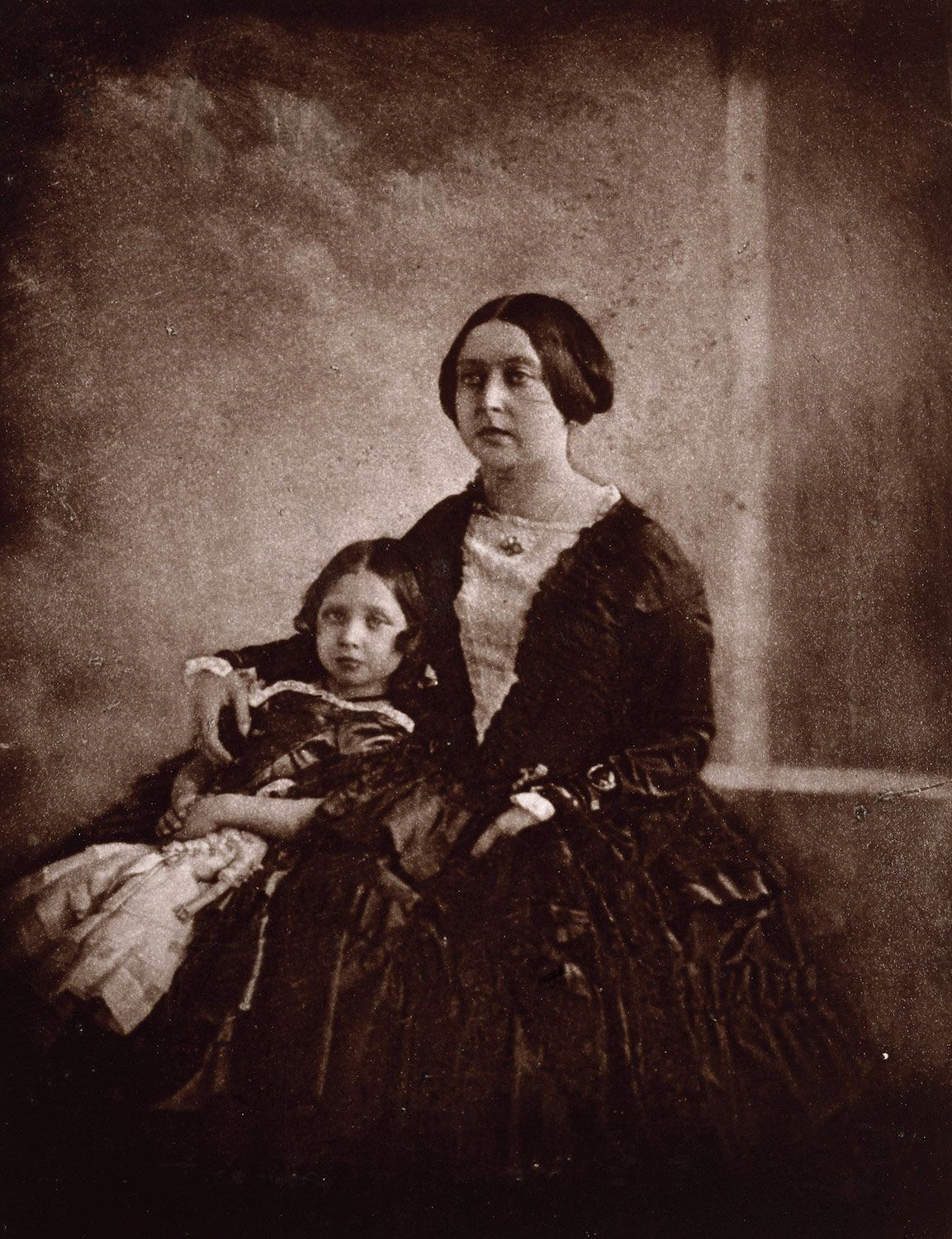
Queen Victoria with the Princess Royal, c. 1844–45

Precocious and intelligent, Victoria began to learn French at the age of 18 months, and to study German when aged four. She also learned Greek and Latin. From the age of six her curriculum included arithmetic, geography and history, and her father tutored her in politics and philosophy. She also studied science and literature. Her school days, interrupted by three hours of recreation, began at 8:20 and finished at 18:00. Unlike her brother, whose curriculum was even more severe, Victoria was an excellent pupil who was always hungry for knowledge. However, she showed an obstinate character.

Queen Victoria and her husband wanted to remove their children from court life as much as possible, so they acquired Osborne House on the Isle of Wight. Near the main building, Albert built for his children a Swiss-inspired cottage with a small kitchen and a carpentry workshop. In this building the royal children learned manual work and practical life. Prince Albert was very involved in the education of their offspring. He closely followed the progress of his children and gave some of their lessons himself as well as spending time playing with them. Victoria is described as having "idolised" her father and having inherited his liberal political views.

=== First meeting with Frederick ===
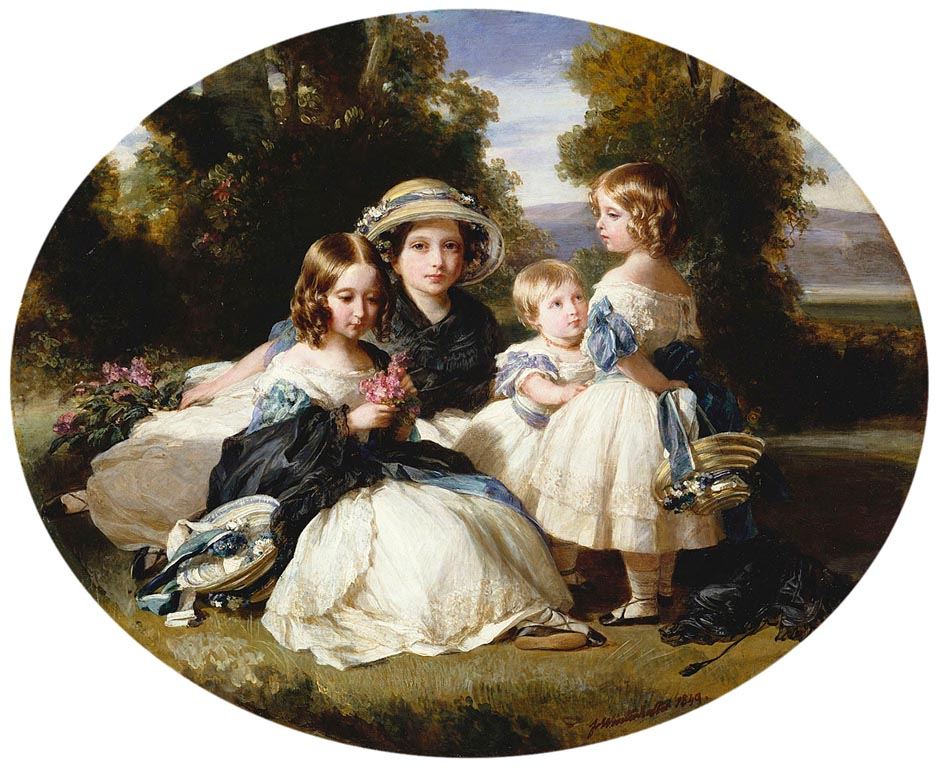
Victoria with her sisters Alice, Louise and Helena. Portrait by Franz Xaver Winterhalter, 1849.

In the German Confederation, Prince William of Prussia and his wife, Princess Augusta of Saxe-Weimar-Eisenach, were among the personalities with whom Queen Victoria and Prince Albert were allies. The British sovereign also had regular epistolary contact with her cousin Augusta after 1846. The revolution that broke out in Berlin in 1848 further strengthened the links between the two royal couples by requiring the heir presumptive to the Prussian throne to find shelter for three months in the British court.

In 1851, William returned to London with his wife and two children (Frederick and Louise) on the occasion of the Great Exhibition. For the first time Victoria met her future husband, and despite the age difference (she was 11 years old and he was 19) they got along very well. To promote the contact between the two, Queen Victoria and Prince Albert asked their daughter to guide Frederick through the exhibition, and during the visit the princess was able to converse in perfect German whereas the prince was able to say only a few words in English. The meeting was therefore a success, and years later Prince Frederick recalled the positive impression that Victoria made on him during this visit, with her mixture of innocence, intellectual curiosity and simplicity.

It was not only his encounter with little Victoria, however, that positively impressed Frederick during the four weeks of his English stay. The young Prussian prince shared his liberal ideas with the Prince Consort. Frederick was fascinated by the relationships among the members of the British royal family. In London, court life was not as rigid and conservative as in Berlin, and Queen Victoria and Prince Albert's relationship with their children was very different from William and Augusta's relationship with theirs.

After Frederick returned to Germany, he began a close correspondence with Victoria. Behind this nascent friendship was the desire of Queen Victoria and her husband to forge closer ties with Prussia. In a letter to her uncle King Leopold I of Belgium the British sovereign conveyed the desire that the meeting between her daughter and the Prussian prince would lead to a closer relationship between the two young people.

== Engagement and marriage ==
=== Engagement ===
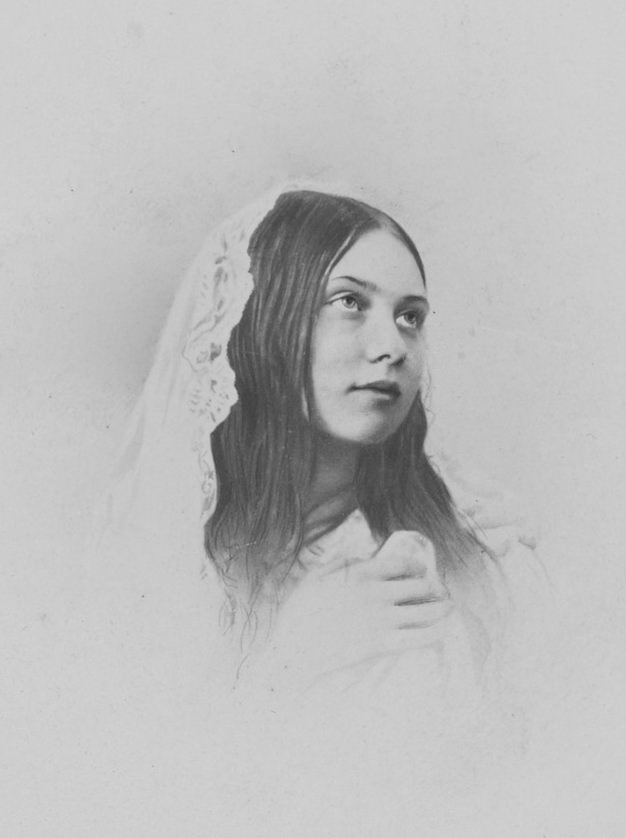
The Princess Royal, c. 1855

Frederick had received a comprehensive education and in particular was formed by personalities such as the writer Ernst Moritz Arndt and historian Friedrich Christoph Dahlmann. According to the tradition of the House of Hohenzollern, he also received rigorous military training.

In 1855 Prince Frederick made another trip to Great Britain and visited Victoria and her family in Scotland at Balmoral Castle. The purpose of his trip was to see the Princess Royal again, to ensure that she would be a suitable consort for him. In Berlin the response to this journey to Britain was far from positive. In fact many members of the Prussian court wanted to see the heir presumptive's son marry a Russian grand duchess. King Frederick William IV, who had allowed his nephew to marry a British princess, even had to keep his approval a secret because his own wife showed strong Anglophobia.

At the time of Frederick's second visit Victoria was 14 years old. A little shorter than her mother, the princess was 1.50 metres (4 feet 11 inches) tall and far from the ideal of beauty of the time. Queen Victoria was concerned that the Prussian prince would not find her daughter sufficiently attractive. Nevertheless, from the first dinner with the prince it was clear to Queen Victoria and Prince Albert that the mutual liking of the two young people that had begun in 1851 was still vivid. In fact after only three days with the royal family Frederick asked Victoria's parents permission to marry their daughter. They were thrilled by the news but gave their approval on condition that the marriage should not take place before Victoria's 17th birthday.

Once this condition was accepted the engagement of Victoria and Frederick was publicly announced on 17 May 1856. The immediate reaction in Great Britain was disapproval. The English public complained about the Kingdom of Prussia's neutrality during the Crimean War of 1853–1856. The Times characterised the Hohenzollern as a "miserable dynasty" that pursued an inconsistent and unreliable foreign policy and depended solely on Russia to maintain its throne. The newspaper also criticised the failure of King Frederick William IV to respect the political guarantees given to the population during the revolution of 1848. In the German Confederation the reactions to the announcement of the engagement were mixed: several members of the Hohenzollern family and conservatives opposed it, and liberal circles welcomed the proposed union with the British crown.

=== Preparation for the role of Prussian princess ===
The Prince Consort, who was part of the Vormärz, had long supported the ‘Coburg plan’, i.e. the idea that a liberal Prussia could serve as an example for other German states and would be able to achieve the Unification of Germany. During the involuntary stay of Prince William of Prussia in London in 1848 the Prince Consort tried to convince his Hohenzollern cousin of the need to transform Prussia into a constitutional monarchy following the British model. However, the future German emperor was not persuaded: he instead kept very conservative views.

Eager to make his daughter the instrument of the liberalisation of Germany, Prince Albert took advantage of the two years of Victoria and Frederick's engagement to give the Princess Royal the most comprehensive training possible. Thus he taught himself history and modern European politics and actually wrote to the princess many essays on events that occurred in Prussia. However, the Prince Consort overestimated the ability of the liberal reform movement in Germany at a time when only a small middle class and some intellectual circles shared his views on the German Confederation. Hence Prince Albert gave his daughter a particularly difficult role, especially in the face of a critical and conservative Hohenzollern court. (Note: In a letter to her half-sister Queen Victoria, Princess Feodora of Leiningen qualified the Prussian court as the center of breeding envy, jealousy, intrigue and pettiness. Pakula 1999, p. 90.)

=== Domestic issues and marriage ===
To pay the dowry of the Princess Royal, the British Parliament allotted the sum of 40,000 pounds and also gave her an allowance of 8,000 pounds per year. Meanwhile, in Berlin, King Frederick William IV provided an annual allowance of 9,000 thalers to his nephew Frederick. The income of the second-in-line to the Prussian throne proved insufficient to cover a budget consistent with his position and that of his future wife. Throughout much of their marriage, Victoria relied on her own resources.

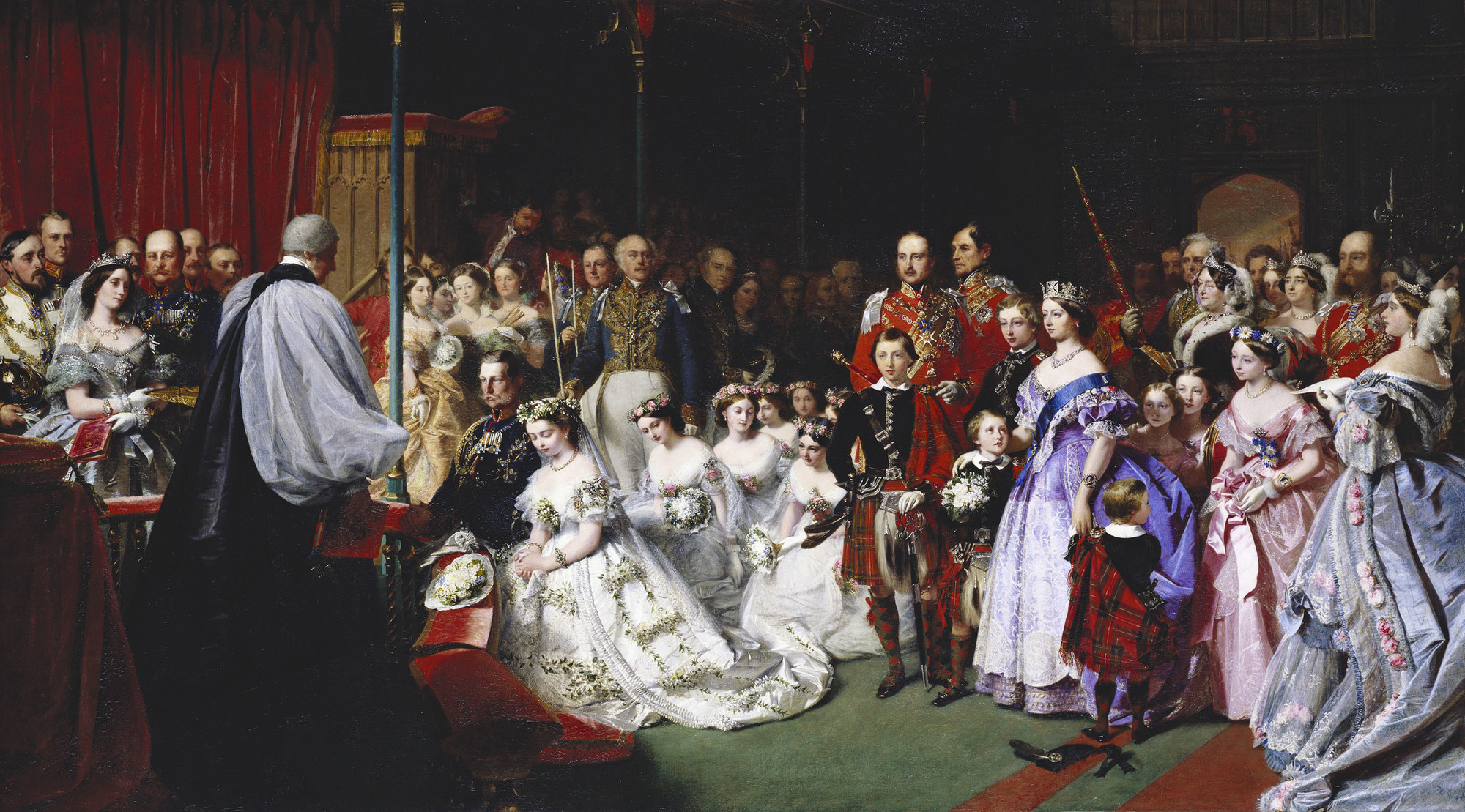
The Marriage of Victoria, Princess Royal by John Phillip, 1860

The Berlin court of the royal couple was chosen by Frederick's aunt, Queen Elisabeth, and his mother, Princess Augusta. They summoned people who had been in court service for a long time and were much older than Victoria and Frederick. Prince Albert therefore asked the Hohenzollerns that his daughter could keep at least two ladies-in-waiting who were her age and of British origin. His request was not completely denied but, as a compromise, Victoria received two young ladies-in-waiting of German origin: Countesses Walburga von Hohenthal and Countess Marie zu Lynar. However, Prince Albert did succeed in imposing Ernst Alfred Christian von Stockmar, the son of his friend Baron von Stockmar, as his daughter's private secretary.

Convinced that the marriage of a British princess to the second-in-line to the Prussian throne would be regarded as an honour by the Hohenzollerns, Prince Albert insisted that his daughter retain her title of Princess Royal after the wedding. However, owing to the very anti-British and pro-Russian views of the Berlin court, the prince's decision only aggravated the situation.

The question of where to hold the marriage ceremony raised the most criticism. To the Hohenzollerns, it seemed natural that the nuptials of the future Prussian king would be held in Berlin. However, Queen Victoria insisted that her eldest daughter must marry in her own country, and in the end, she prevailed. The wedding of Victoria and Frederick took place at the Chapel Royal of St. James's Palace in London on 25 January 1858.

== Princess of Prussia ==
=== Maternal criticism ===
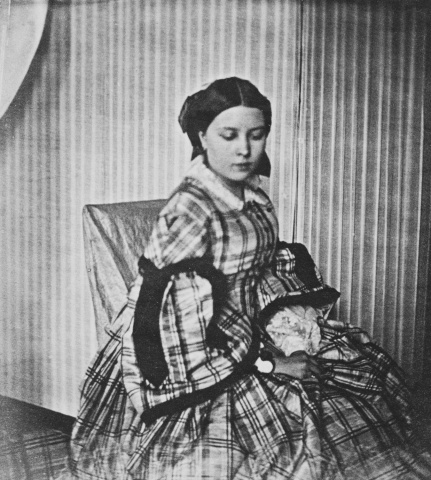
Victoria, Princess Frederick William of Prussia, March 1859

Victoria's move to Berlin began a large correspondence between the princess and her parents. Each week, she sent a letter to her father that usually contained comments on German political events. The majority of these letters have been preserved and have become a valuable source for knowing the Prussian court.

But these letters also show the will of Queen Victoria to dictate her daughter's every move. She demanded that Victoria appear equally loyal to her homeland and her new country. But this quickly became impossible, and the most insignificant events confronted the princess with insoluble problems. For example, the death of the Duchess of Orléans, a distant relative of the British and Prussian royal houses, brought a month of mourning in London, while in Berlin the mourning period lasted only one week. Victoria was bound to respect the period of mourning in use among the Hohenzollerns, but this earned her the criticism of her mother, who believed that, as a Princess Royal and daughter of the queen of the United Kingdom of Great Britain and Ireland, Victoria should follow the custom in use in England.

Concerned about the effect of the continual maternal criticism on Victoria's psychological health, Baron von Stockmar asked Prince Albert to intervene and ask the queen to moderate her demands. However, the baron was unable to reduce the attacks that the princess suffered from the Russophilic and Anglophobic circles of the Berlin court. For most of the 19th century, Russia and Britain were not just geopolitical rivals in Asia, but also ideological opponents as many in both nations believed autocratic Russia and democratic Britain were destined to battle each for world domination. In Prussia, the Junkers tended to see much in common with the ordered society of Imperial Russia, and disliked British democracy. She was often hurt by unkind comments from the Hohenzollern family.

A keen amateur gardener, Victoria's attempts to import English-style gardens into Prussia prompted what became known as the "Anglo-Prussian garden war" as the court fought from 1858 onward against Victoria's attempts to change the gardens at the Sanssouci palace into something more English. The simple, unadorned English-style geometric garden designs favored by Victoria were out of favor with the Prussian court which favored the Italianate style, and which ferociously resisted Victoria's attempts to create English-style gardens.

=== Official duties ===
At 17 years old, Victoria had to perform many tedious official duties. Almost every evening, she had to appear at formal dinners, theatrical performances or public receptions. If foreign relatives of the Hohenzollerns were located in Berlin or Potsdam, her protocolary duties widened. Sometimes she was forced to greet guests of the royal family at the station at 7:00 in the morning and be present at receptions past midnight.

Upon the arrival of Victoria in Berlin, King Frederick William IV gave to Frederick and his wife an old wing of the Berlin Palace. The building was in very bad condition, and it did not even contain a bathtub. The couple moved to the Kronprinzenpalais in November 1858. In summer, they resided at the Neues Palais.

=== First childbirth ===
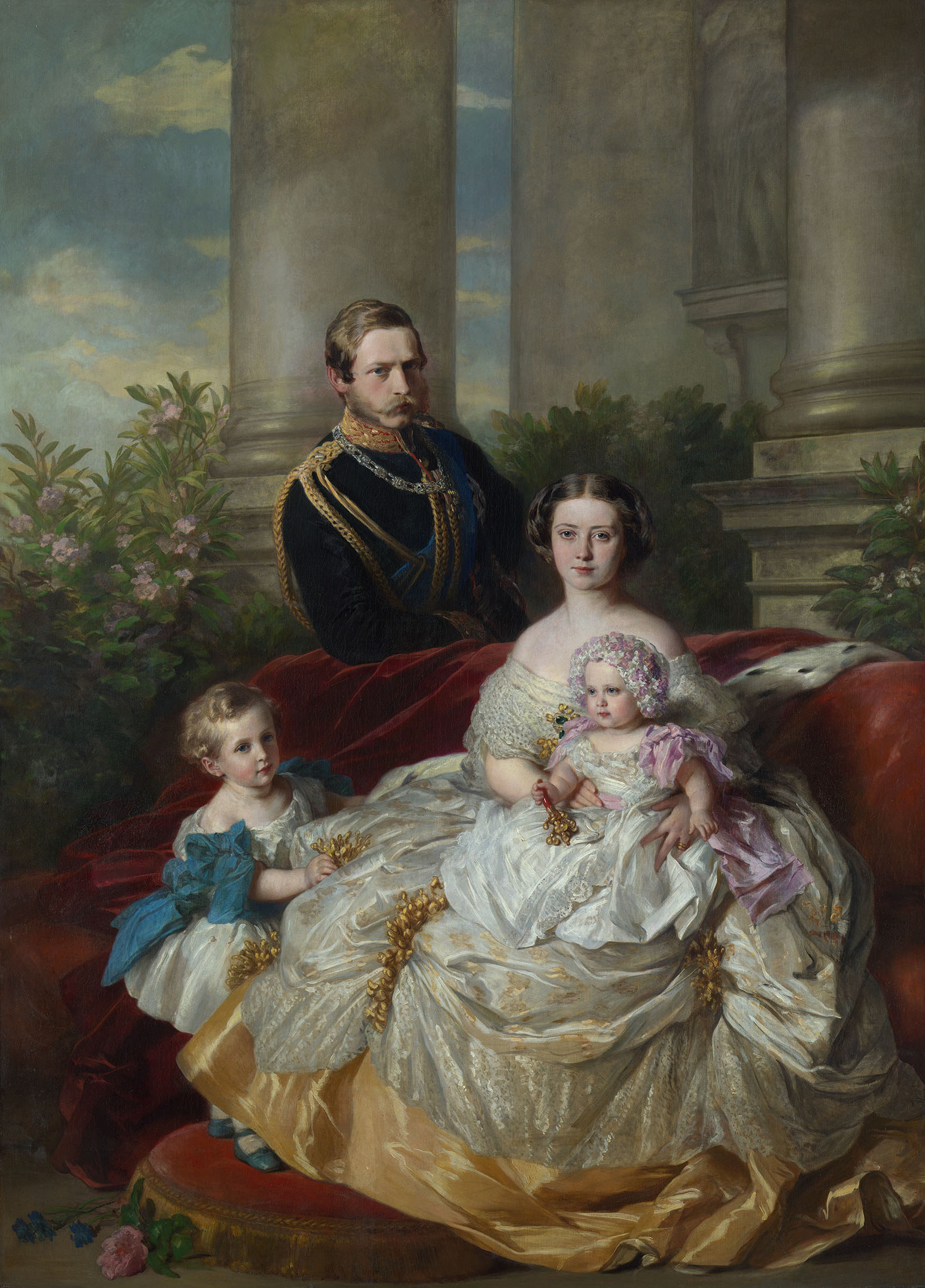
Prince Frederick William of Prussia with his wife and two older children, Prince William and Princess Charlotte. Portrait by Franz Xaver Winterhalter, 1862

A little over a year after her marriage, on 27 January 1859, Victoria gave birth to her first child, the future German Emperor Wilhelm II. The delivery was extremely complicated. The maid responsible for alerting doctors to the onset of contractions delayed giving notice. Moreover, the gynecologists hesitated to examine the princess, who was wearing only a flannel nightgown. The baby was in breech, and the delayed delivery could have caused the death of both the princess and her son.

Finally, doctors managed to save both mother and child. The baby, however, suffered damage at the brachial plexus, and the nerves in his arm were injured. As he grew, it failed to develop normally, and by the time Wilhelm was an adult, his left arm was fifteen centimetres (5.9 in) shorter than his right. There is also speculation that the difficult labour caused fetal distress, which deprived the future emperor of oxygen for eight to ten minutes and might have brought about other neurological problems.

The doctors tried to calm both Victoria and Frederick, affirming that their baby could recover fully from his injuries. Still, the couple chose not to inform the British court of Wilhelm's condition. However, over the weeks it became clear that the child's arm would not recover, and, after four months of doubts, Victoria decided to give the sad news to her parents. Fortunately for the princess, the birth of her second child, Princess Charlotte, on 24 July 1860, took place without difficulty.

== Crown Princess of Prussia ==
=== Early issues and struggles ===
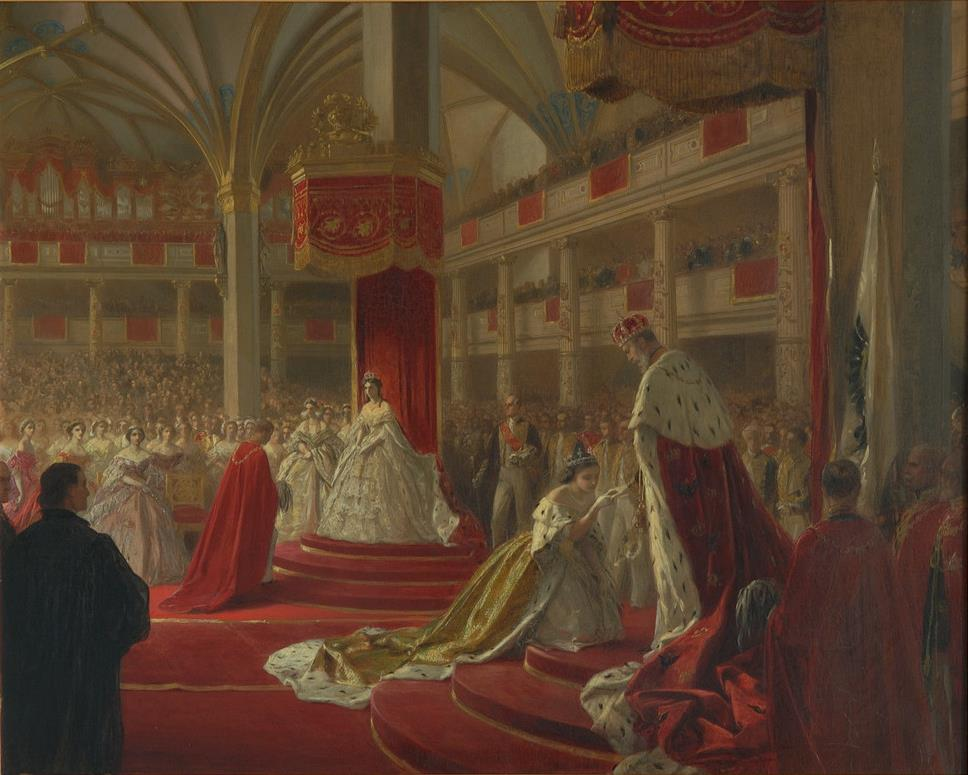
The Crown Princess of Prussia paying homage to her father-in-law at his coronation on 18 October 1861 in the Schlosskirche in Königsberg. Detail of painting by George Housman Thomas, 1861.

With the death of King Frederick William IV on 2 January 1861, his brother, who had acted as regent since 1858, ascended the throne as King William I. Frederick was then the new crown prince of Prussia but his situation at court did not change much: his father refused to increase his allowance, and Crown Princess Victoria continued to contribute significantly to the family budget with her dowry and allowance. In a letter to the Baron von Stockmar, Prince Albert commented on the situation:

To me it is obvious that a certain person is opposed to the financial independence of the princess ... [She] not only has not received a pfennig from Prussia, which is already calamitous, but has also had to use her dowry, which it should not be necessary. If they refuse the money to the poor Crown Prince for having a "rich wife", what they will get is impoverishing her.

In addition to their financial limitations, Frederick and Victoria faced more problems. As heir apparent, he could not travel outside Prussia without the king's permission. There was a rumour that this measure was intended to limit Victoria's travels to the United Kingdom. Upon his accession to the throne, King William I received a letter from Prince Albert in which he implicitly asked that the Prussian constitution serve as an example for other German states. However, this letter increased the king's resentment of Albert and of Frederick and Victoria, who had the same liberal ideas.

=== Father's death and political crisis ===
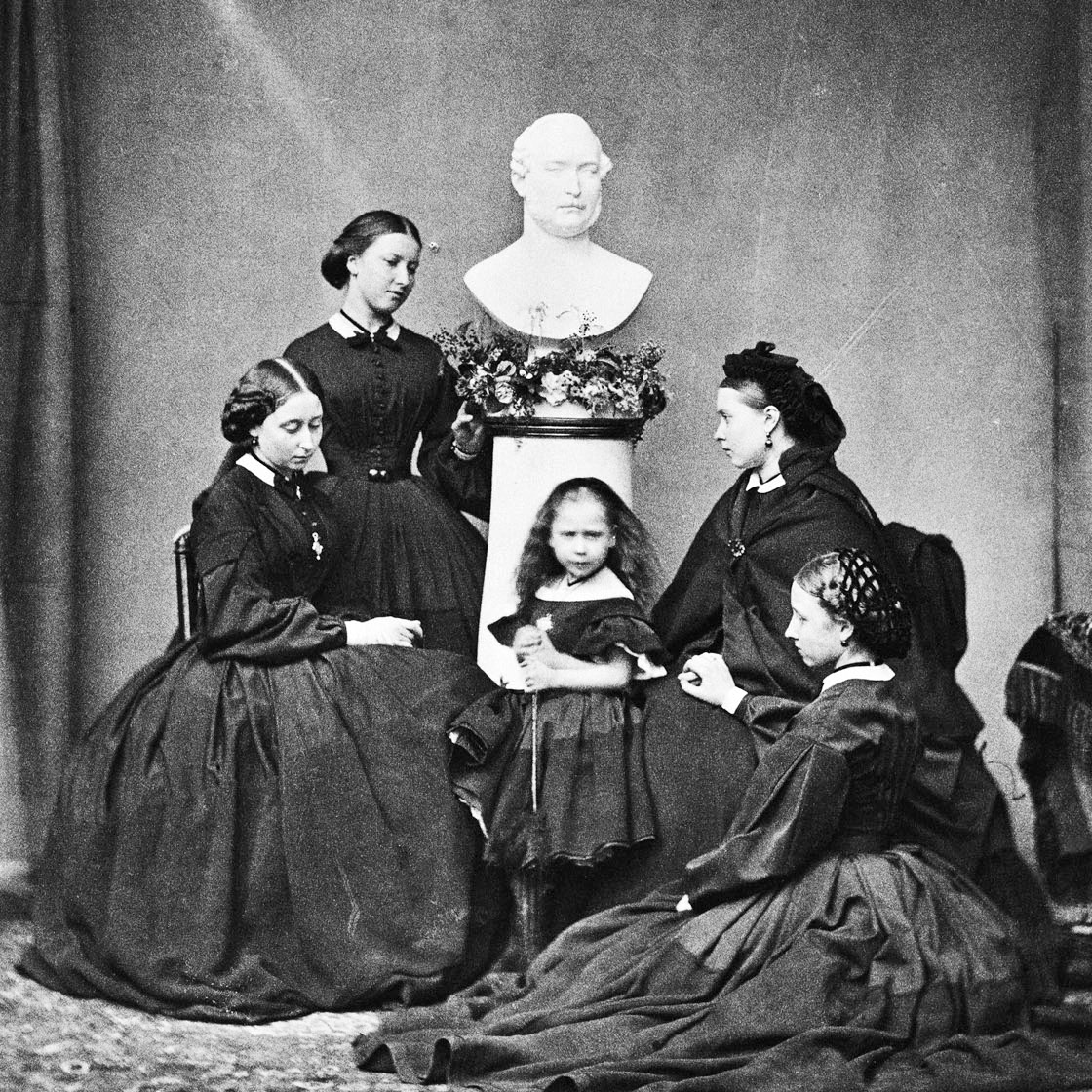
The Crown Princess of Prussia and her sisters in mourning for their father, March 1862

On 14 December 1861, Prince Albert died of typhoid fever. Because of her very close relationship with her father, Victoria was devastated by the news. She went with her husband to England to attend the funeral.

Shortly after this tragedy Frederick and Victoria, still in mourning, had to face the first major crisis of William I's reign, and they were not prepared to deal with it. The Prussian Parliament denied the king the money needed for his plan of reorganisation of the army. William I considered the reform to be of paramount importance and decided to dissolve the parliament on 11 March 1862, reviving the Prussian constitutional conflict. (Note: For more details on this crisis, see Kollander 1995, pp. 25–45.) In a fierce confrontation between the crown and the Landtag, the king considered setting a deadline for leaving the throne.

Victoria tried to convince her husband to accept his father's abdication. However, the prince did not agree with his wife and supported his father, saying that he would stand firm before the Landtag. For Frederick, the abdication of a monarch after a conflict with the parliament would create a dangerous precedent and weaken his successors. The crown prince also judged that his support of his father's abdication in his favour would be a serious dereliction of his duties as a son.

Finally, William I chose not to abdicate and appointed Otto von Bismarck as Minister President of Prussia on 22 September. Leader of the Conservative Party, the politician was willing to rule without a parliamentary majority and even without an authorised budget. The king was pleased with the situation, but his wife, the liberal Queen Augusta, and especially his son and daughter-in-law, harshly criticised the decision. However, Bismarck remained at the head of the Prussian government and subsequently of the German government until 1890 and was instrumental in the isolation of the crown prince and his wife.

=== Increasing isolation ===
With the outbreak of the Prussian constitutional conflict, the opposition between liberals and conservatives in Berlin reached its peak. Suspected of supporting parliamentarians against William I, the Crown Prince and his wife were subjected to harsh criticism. The trip that the couple made to the Mediterranean in October 1862 aboard Queen Victoria's yacht served as a pretext for conservatives to accuse Frederick of abandoning his father in a time of great political tension. They also emphasised the fact that the crown prince travelled aboard a foreign vessel escorted by an English warship.

Following the announcement of the engagement between Victoria's brother the Prince of Wales and Princess Alexandra of Denmark, daughter of the future King Christian IX and representative of a rival Prussian state, (Note: Between 1848 and 1850, Denmark and several German states, including Prussia, were at war for the possession of the Duchies of Schleswig-Holstein. An international convention finally recognised the union of the duchies to Denmark, but German states continued to claim the integration of the two provinces into the German Confederation.) Victoria's position in the Berlin court was further weakened. The German public was of the opinion that the Crown Princess was responsible for encouraging the union between Denmark and the United Kingdom.

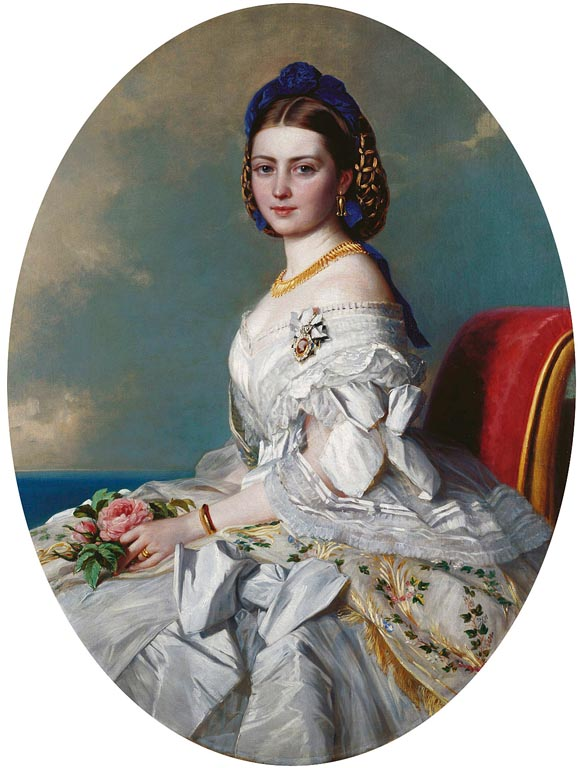
Portrait by Albert Gräfle, 1863

Frederick caused an incident when he openly criticised the policy of his father and Bismarck. During the official visit to Danzig, the crown prince publicly rejected an order issued by Bismarck on 1 June 1863 that allowed the Prussian authorities to prohibit the publication of a newspaper whose content was considered inappropriate. Enraged by the speech of his son, William I accused him of disobedience and threatened to suspend him from his military duties and even to exclude him from the succession to the throne. In conservative circles, which demanded exemplary punishment, few joined the voices of Prince Charles, the king's younger brother, and General Edwin von Manteuffel, who believed that Frederick should be tried in a court-martial.

Naturally, Victoria was not immune to these criticisms from conservatives. In fact, many suspected that she was behind the words of the heir's speech in Danzig.

Severely criticised in Germany, the couple saw their behaviour praised in Great Britain. The Times noted:

"It is hard to imagine a more challenging role than the crown prince and his wife, who are without a counsellor, between a coward monarch, an impetuous cabinet and an indignant population."

The support of the British newspaper became a new source of problems for Frederick and Victoria. The article contained everyday details suggesting that Victoria revealed certain confidential information to the press. The authorities opened an investigation against her, and because of this pressure, Victoria's personal secretary, Baron Ernst von Stockmar, resigned his position.

=== Prussian-Danish War ===
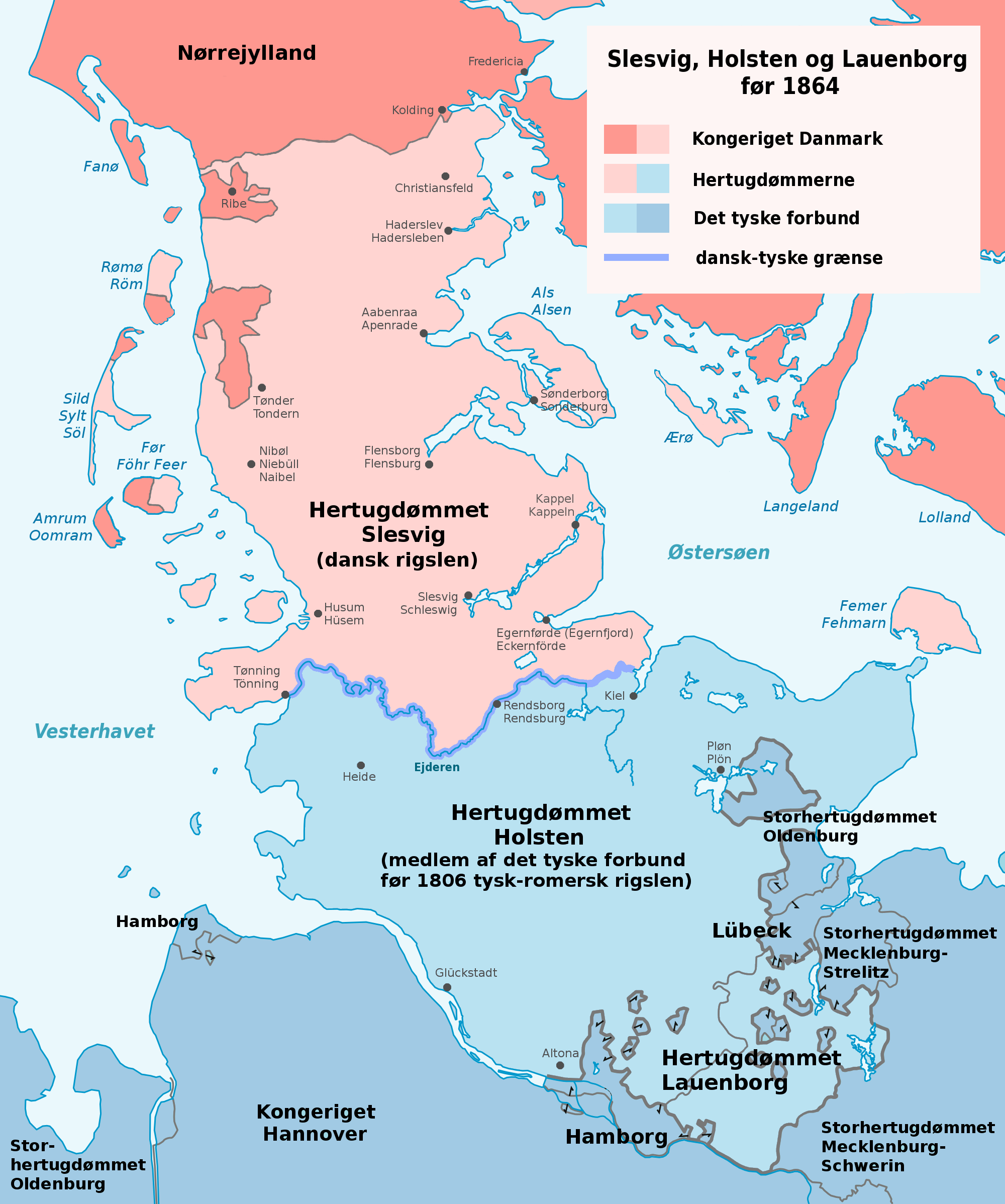
The Duchies of Schleswig, Holstein und Lauenburg in 1864

In the international arena, Bismarck tried to build German unity around Prussia. His plans were to end the Austrian influence in the German Confederation and impose Prussian hegemony in Germany. Faithful to his objectives, Bismarck involved Prussia in the Second Schleswig War against Denmark in 1864. However, the prime minister counteracted with the help of Austria in the conflict.

Despite the familial relations of the Prince of Wales with Copenhagen, the British government refused to intervene in the war between the German Confederation and Denmark. That had a certain importance in the royal family, which was deeply divided by the conflict. In addition, many in Berlin suspected that the crown princess was unhappy over the Prussian military successes against the country of her sister-in-law Alexandra.

Despite criticism and distrust, Victoria supported German troops. Following the example of Florence Nightingale, who had helped to improve the medical care of British soldiers in the Crimean War, the crown princess became involved in the aid of wounded soldiers. During the birthday celebrations of William I, Victoria, along with her husband, created a social fund for the families of soldiers killed or seriously injured.

During the war, Frederick joined the Prussian Army and was part of the fighting under the command of Field Marshal Friedrich von Wrangel. He distinguished himself with his courageous valour in the Battle of Dybbøl (7–18 April 1864) that marked the defeat of Denmark by the Austro-Prussian coalition. Pleased with the German victory, Victoria expected the military success of her husband would encourage people to understand that she was the wife of the heir apparent. In a letter to Frederick, she complained of the constant criticism and being considered too British in Prussia and too Prussian in Great Britain.

With the final victory over Denmark and the Treaty of Vienna (signed on 30 October 1864), it was decided that the duchies of Schleswig, Holstein and Saxe-Lauenburg would be administered by a joint Prussian-Austrian government. However, this new division became a source of conflict between Vienna and Berlin.

=== Austro-Prussian War ===
After the War of the Duchies, Germany experienced a short period of peace. The Gastein Convention, signed by the two winners on 14 August 1865, placed the former Danish provinces under Prussian-Austrian control and both countries occupied a part of the duchies. However, differences of opinion concerning the administration of the provinces quickly triggered a conflict between the former allies. On 9 June 1866, Prussia occupied Holstein, which was administered by Austria. In the meanwhile, Vienna asked the Diet of the German Confederation for a general mobilisation of the German states against Prussia, which took place on 14 June.

Considering the mobilisation illegal, Prussia proclaimed the dissolution of the German Confederation and invaded Saxony, Hanover and Hesse-Kassel, effectively starting the Austro-Prussian War. During the Battle of Königgrätz (3 July 1866) in which Crown Prince Frederick was instrumental, Austria suffered a heavy defeat and capitulated shortly afterward. Finally, with the Peace of Prague (23 August 1866), Vienna withdrew from the German Confederation, which was dissolved. Schleswig-Holstein, Hanover, Hesse-Kassel, the Duchy of Nassau and the Free City of Frankfurt were annexed by Prussia.

Shortly after the Prussian victory at Königgrätz, Bismarck asked the parliament for more money for the army, which raised a new controversy between the liberal parliamentarians. Frederick welcomed the creation of the North German Confederation, which joined Prussia and some Germanic principalities, because he saw that it was the first step toward German unification. However, the confederation was far from adopting the liberal ideas of the crown prince. Despite being democratically elected, the Reichstag did not have the same powers as the British parliament. In addition, local sovereigns were more interested in maintaining their prerogatives, and the new North German Constitution gave many powers to Chancellor Otto von Bismarck. Less enthusiastic than her husband, Victoria saw the North German Confederation as an extension of the Prussian political system, which she hated. (Note: For the political divisions of Victoria and Frederick, see Kollander 1995, pp. 16–17 and 79–88.) Nevertheless, she remained hopeful that the situation was temporary and that a united and liberal Germany could be created.

=== Family life ===
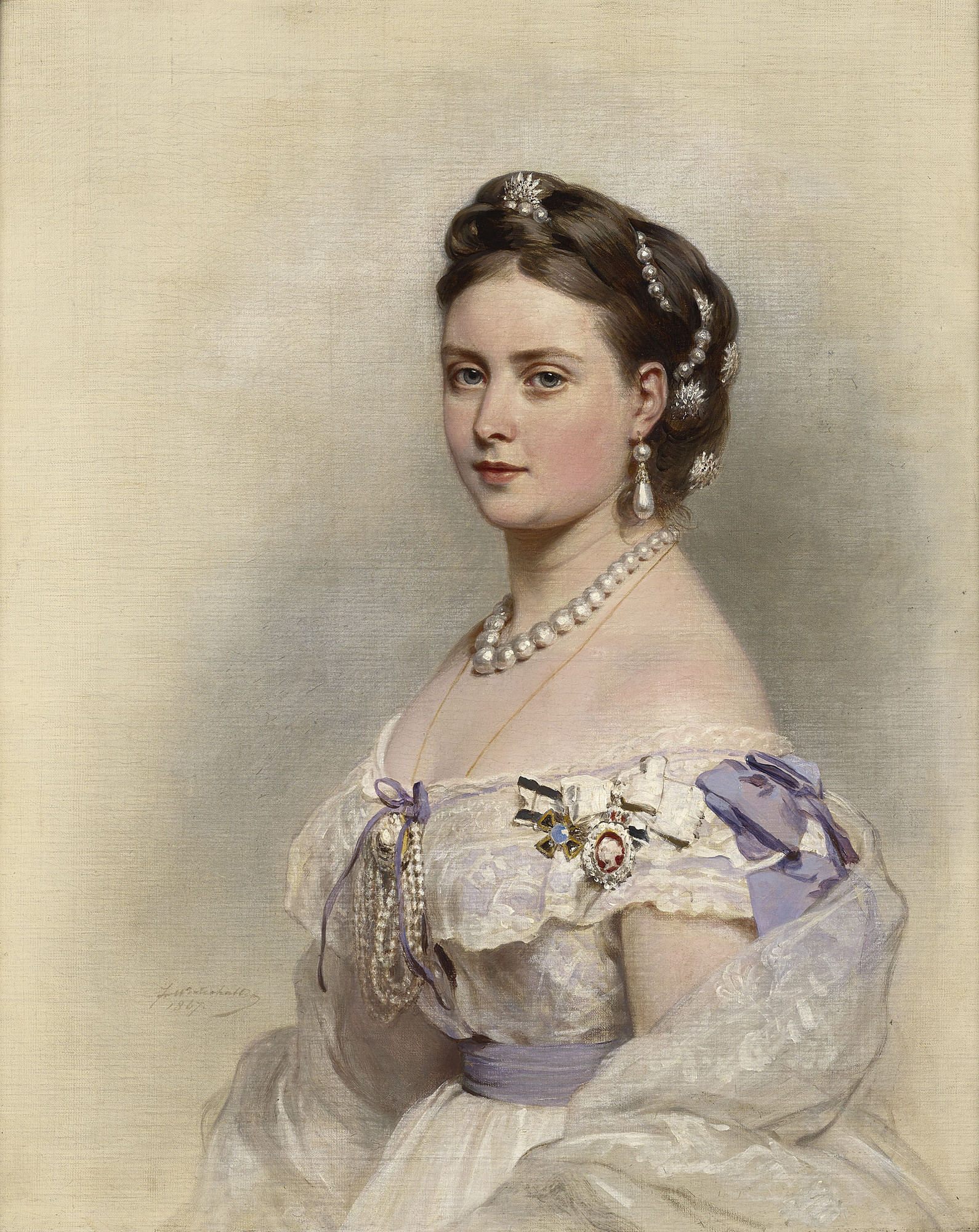
Victoria in 1867, portrait by Franz Xaver Winterhalter

During the Austro-Prussian War, Victoria and Frederick received a hard blow. Sigismund, their fourth child, died of meningitis at 21 months on 18 June 1866, just a few days before the Battle of Königgrätz. The tragedy devastated the Crown Princess, who received no comfort from her mother or her in-laws. Queen Victoria, still mourning the loss of Prince Albert, did not understand her daughter's feelings and believed that the loss of a child was much less severe than that of a husband. Queen Augusta demanded that her daughter-in-law quickly resume her official duties.

With peace restored in Germany, the crown prince frequently travelled abroad to represent the Berlin court. Victoria rarely accompanied her husband on the trips, mainly because they tried to keep their expenses to a minimum. In addition, the crown princess did not want to leave her children for long periods of time. After Sigismund's death, the royal family grew with the arrival of four new children between 1866 and 1872. While the elder children (Wilhelm, Charlotte and Henry) were left in the care of governesses, the younger ones (Sigismund, Victoria, Waldemar, Sophie and Margaret) were raised personally by Victoria, which was a point of conflict with both her mother and mother-in-law.

In Berlin, Victoria's situation remained difficult, and her relationship with Queen Augusta, who also had liberal ideas, continued to be tense. Any gesture from her was a pretext for the worst criticism from her mother-in-law; for example, Augusta disapproved when Victoria chose to use a landau instead of a traditional barouche with two horses. The opposition between the two women grew so much that Queen Victoria had to intercede for her daughter with William I.

=== Franco-Prussian War ===
On 19 July 1870 the Franco-Prussian War began, and it would lead to the fall of the Second French Empire. As in previous conflicts against Denmark and Austria, Frederick participated actively in the fight against the French. At the head of the 3rd German army, he had a decisive role in the battles of Wissembourg (4 August 1870) and Wörth (6 August 1870), and also had a notorious role in the Battle of Sedan (1 September 1870) during the Siege of Paris. Jealous of the military success of the heir to the throne, Bismarck tried to undermine his prestige. The chancellor used the late arrival of the Third German Army to Paris to accuse the crown prince of trying to protect France under pressure from his mother and his wife. During an official dinner, Bismarck accused the queen and Victoria of being ardently francophile, an incident that was soon known by the newspapers.

Victoria's commitment to the wounded soldiers had no impact in the German press. In Hamburg, she had built a military hospital, running it regardless of costs, in addition to visiting the war-wounded soldiers in Wiesbaden, Biberach, Bingen, Bingerbrück, Rüdesheim and Mainz. However, Victoria was accused of performing tasks normally attributed to the queen, prompting the wrath of her in-laws. Finally, William I ordered her to stop that "theater of charity" and return to Berlin to represent the royal family.

== German Crown Princess ==
=== Proclamation of the German Empire ===
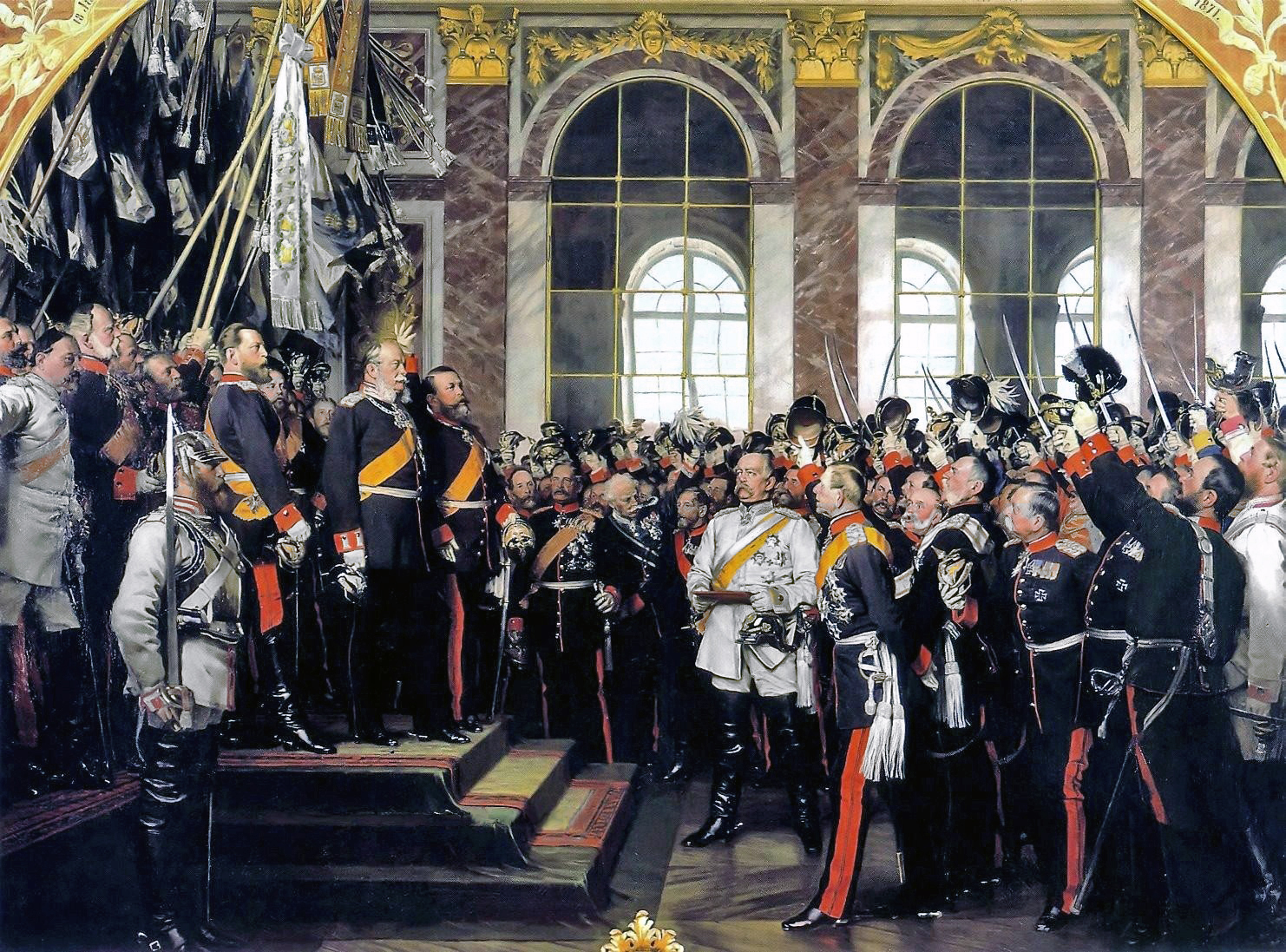
Proclamation of the German Empire by Anton von Werner, 1885. Bismarck is at the center dressed in white. The crown prince is behind his father.

On 18 January 1871, the princes of the North German Confederation and those of South Germany (Bavaria, Baden, Württemberg and Hesse-Darmstadt) proclaimed Wilhelm I as hereditary German Emperor in the Hall of Mirrors at the Palace of Versailles. Then they symbolically united their states within a new German Empire. Frederick and Victoria became German crown prince and crown princess, and Otto von Bismarck was appointed imperial chancellor.

Subsequently, the Catholic states of South Germany that were previously bound to Prussia by a Zollverein (Customs Union), were officially incorporated into Unified Germany by the treaties of Versailles (26 February 1871) and Frankfurt (10 May 1871).

=== Enlightened princess ===
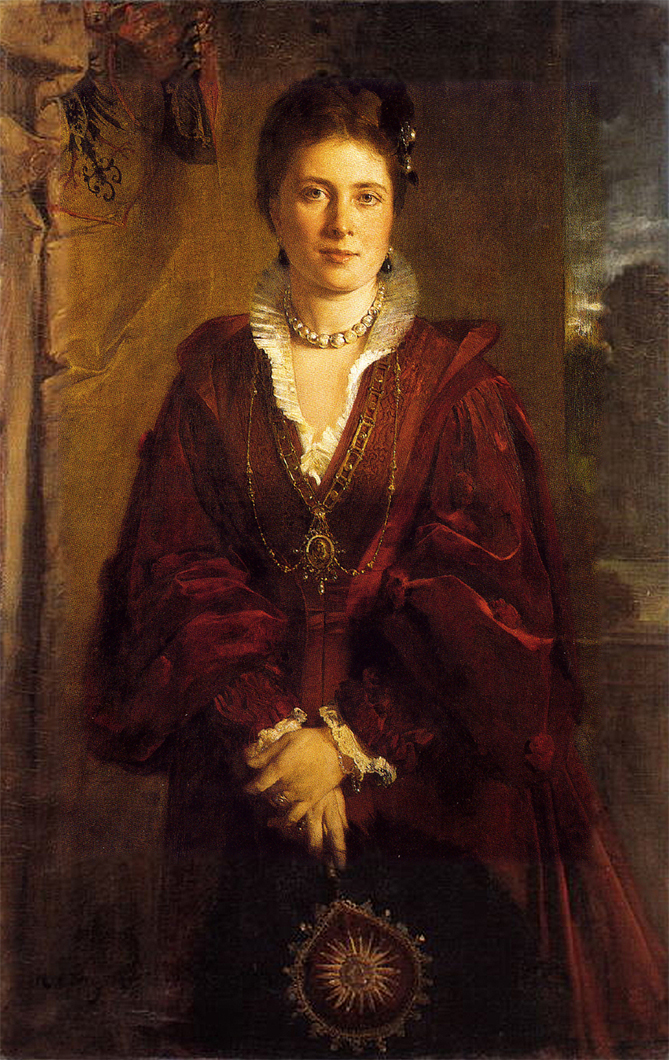
Portrait by Heinrich von Angeli, 1871

Despite being named field marshal because of his military performance in the wars of the 1860s, Frederick did not receive the command of any troops after the Franco-Prussian War. In fact, the emperor did not trust his own son and tried to keep him away from state affairs because of his "too English" ideas. The crown prince was appointed "Curator of the Royal Museums", a task that raised some enthusiasm in his wife. Following the advice of her father, Victoria had continued her intellectual formation after arriving in Germany: she read Goethe, Lessing, Heine and Stuart Mill and frequented intellectual circles with her husband. The writer Gustav Freytag was a close friend of the couple and Gustav zu Putlitz was appointed Frederick's Chamberlain for some time. Despite the indignation of her mother, Victoria was also interested in the Theory of Evolution of Darwin and the ideas of British geologist Lyell. The German astronomer Wilhelm Julius Foerster reported that she visited the Berlin Observatory frequently and took keen interest in his astronomical work, and in the growth of the German Society for Ethical Culture. Eager to understand the principles of socialism, she read the work of Karl Marx and encouraged her husband to frequent the salon of Countess Marie von Schleinitz, a place known for being a meeting point of Bismarck's opponents.

Unlike many of their contemporaries, Victoria and Frederick rejected antisemitism. In a letter to her mother, Victoria harshly criticised the essay Das Judenthum in der Musik (Jewry in Music) by Richard Wagner, whom she considered ridiculous and unfair. As for Frederick, he did not hesitate to make public appearances in synagogues when manifestations began of hatred against the Jews in Germany, especially in the early 1880s. In 1880–1881, there was a campaign waged by the Völkisch movement to disemancipate German Jews, led by the Lutheran Pastor Adolf Stoecker and the historian Heinrich von Treitschke, leading to a quarter of a million Germans signing a petition asking the government to ban all Jewish immigration, forbid Jews from holding public office, to work as teachers, and from attending universities, which was a mere prelude to the ultimate goal of the völkisch activists: stripping Jews of their German citizenship. Both Stoecker and Treitschke were very popular and well respected men in Germany, and their antisemitic campaign attracted much support from the Prussian Army officer corps, university students, and the court, but Victoria was fearless in attacking the antisemitic leaders and wrote, "Treitschke and his supporters are lunatics of the most dangerous sort". In another letter, Victoria suggested that Stoecker and his followers belonged in a lunatic asylum since so much of what he had to say reflected an unbalanced mind. In yet another letter, she wrote that she had become ashamed of her adopted country as Stoecker and Treitschke "behave so hatefully towards people of a different faith and another race who have become an integral part (and by no means the worst) of our nation!".

Victoria and her husband, the latter wearing the uniform of a Prussian field marshal, attended a synagogue service in Berlin in 1880 to show support for the German Jews threatened by what Victoria called Treitschke's "disgraceful" attacks. In 1881, they attended a synagogue service in Wiesbaden "to demonstrate as clearly as we can what our convictions are" just as the Reichstag was beginning to debate the issue of Jewish disemancipation. Her mother, Queen Victoria, was proud of her daughter and son-in-law's efforts to stop the völkisch campaign and wrote to Frederick to say she was happy that her daughter had married a man like him, who was prepared to stand up for the rights of the Jews. In both the Kronprinzenpalais and Neues Palais in Potsdam, the crown princely couple received many commoners, including some Jewish personalities, which inevitably led to the disapproval of the emperor and the court. Among their guests were the physicians Hermann von Helmholtz and Rudolf Virchow, the philosopher Eduard Zeller, and the historian Hans Delbrück. The reactionary and antisemitic Field Marshal Alfred von Waldersee felt so threatened by the prospect of Frederick becoming emperor and Victoria empress that he planned, were Frederick to ascend to the throne, to have the military stage a coup d'état in favor of his son Prince Wilhelm; to have Victoria expelled back to Britain and to have her executed if she ever returned to Germany; to end universal manhood suffrage for the Reichstag; and to have Germany launch a war to "take out" France, Austria, and Russia (the fact that Germany was allied to the last two did not matter to Waldersee). Only the fact that Frederick was already dying of cancer when he became emperor in 1888 kept Waldersee from going ahead with his plans for a putsch.

An art lover, Victoria appreciated and practised painting, receiving classes from Anton von Werner and Heinrich von Angeli. She also supported education and was a member of the association founded by Wilhelm Adolf Lette in 1866, whose objective was to improve women's education. Beginning in 1877, Victoria founded schools for girls (the "Victoriaschule für Mädchen") directed by British teachers, in addition to nursing schools (the "Victoriahaus zur Krankenpflege") based on the English model.

=== Mother of a large family ===
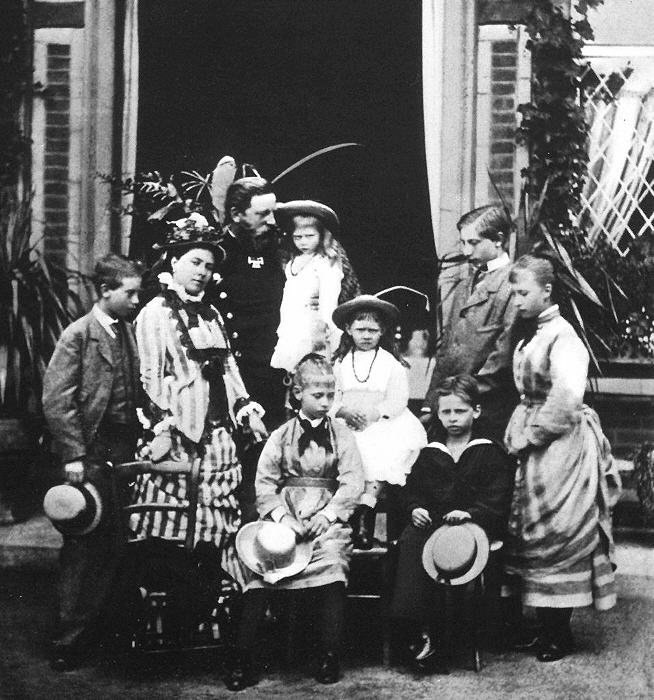
The Crown Prince's family, 1875

Victoria's eldest son went through various treatments to cure his atrophied arm. Strange methods, such as the so-called "animal baths" in which the arm was immersed in the entrails of recently dead rabbits, were performed with some regularity. In addition, William also underwent electroshock sessions in an attempt to revive the nerves passing through the left arm to the neck and also to prevent his head tilting to one side. Victoria insisted that he become a good rider. The thought that he, as heir to the throne, should not be able to ride was intolerable to her. Riding lessons began when William was eight and were a matter of endurance for him. Over and over, the weeping prince was set on his horse and compelled to go through the paces. He fell off time after time but despite his tears was set on its back again. After weeks, he finally got it right and maintained his balance. William later wrote: "The torments inflicted on me, in this pony riding, must be attributed to my mother."

For Victoria, her son's disability was a disgrace. Her letters and her diary show her grief for her son's arm and her guilt for having given birth to a disabled child. During a visit to her parents in 1860, she wrote about her eldest son:

"He is really smart for his age...if only he didn't have that unfortunate arm, I would be so proud of him."

Sigmund Freud speculated that Victoria, being unable to accept the illness of her child, distanced herself from her first-born, which made a great impact on the behaviour of the future William II. However, other authors, such as the historian Wolfgang Mommsen, insist that the she was very affectionate with her children. According to him, she wanted her children to be like the idealised figure of her own father and tried, as best she could, to follow the educational precepts of Prince Albert. In 1863, Victoria and Frederick bought a cottage in Bornstedt so that their children could grow up in an environment similar to that of Osborne House. However, Victoria's influence on her offspring had an important limitation: like all the Hohenzollerns, her sons received a military training from a very young age, and she feared that such education would undermine their values.

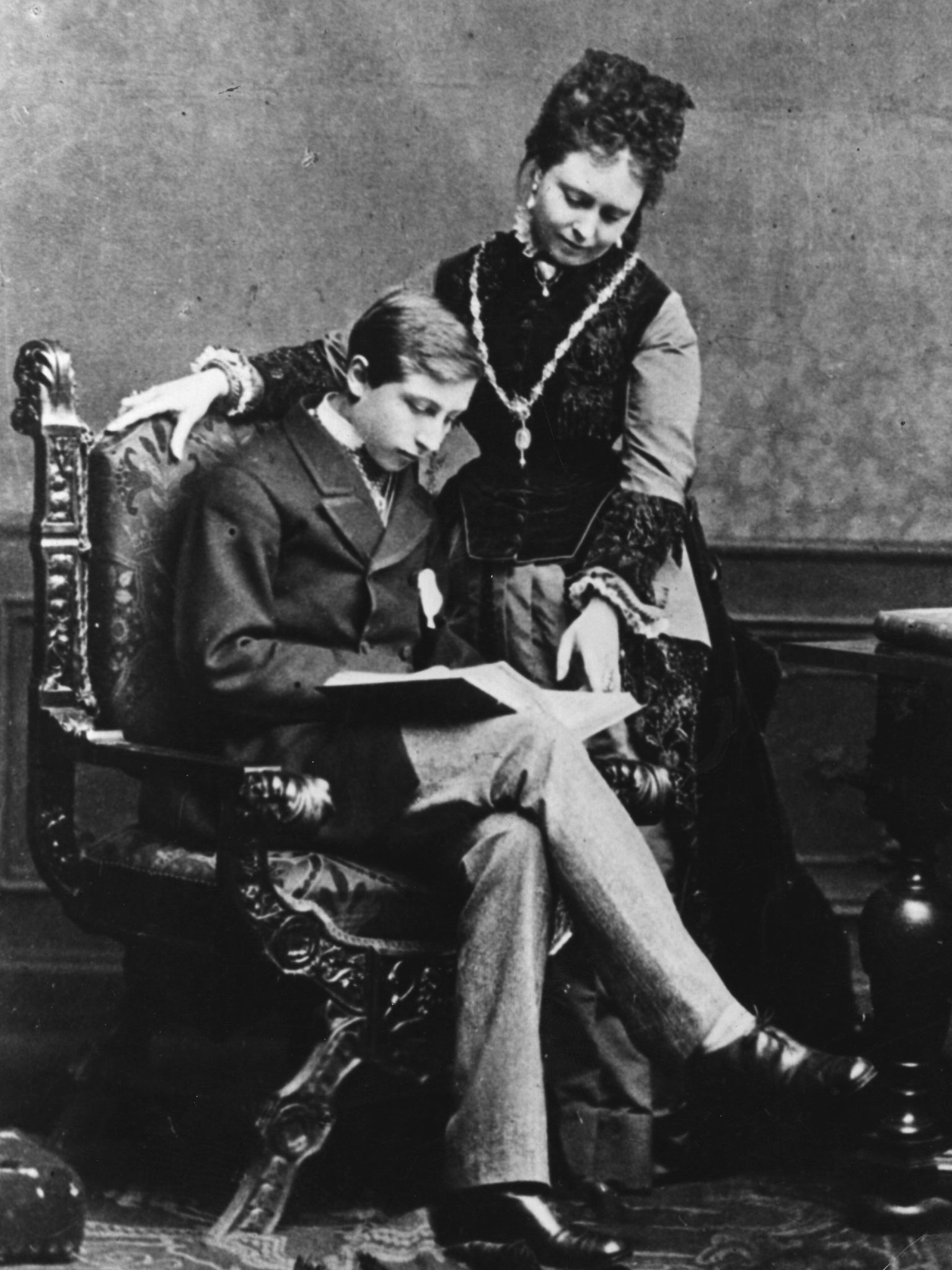
Victoria with her eldest child, Wilhelm, in the 1870s

Willing to give their children the best education possible, Victoria and her husband entrusted this task to the bright, strict Calvinist philologist Georg Ernst Hinzpeter. Reputedly a liberal, Hinzpeter was in fact a staunch conservative who made William and Henry undergo a rigorous and puritanical upbringing, without praise or incentives. To complete their education, the princes were sent to a school in Kassel despite the opposition of the king and court. Finally, William was enrolled at the University of Bonn, and his younger brother, who did not show the same intellectual interests, was sent to the navy at 16 years old. The education received by the children did not allow them to have the open and liberal personalities that their parents wanted.

While her two eldest sons were approaching adulthood, Victoria suffered another blow with the death of her 11-year-old son, Waldemar, on 27 March 1879 of diphtheria. Without having recovered from the death of Sigismund, the crown princess was devastated with the loss of another child especially since he died of the same disease that had taken her sister Alice, Grand Duchess of Hesse and by Rhine and her niece Princess Marie just a few months earlier. Victoria, however, tried to keep her suffering secret because, except for her husband, no other family member was willing to comfort her.

If her sons were sources of great concern, Victoria's daughters rarely caused problems. The only exception was Charlotte, the eldest of the princesses. A girl with slow growth and a difficult education, she was regularly prone to fits of rage during her childhood. Growing up, her health became delicate, and in addition to her capricious personality, she also revealed an irritable character. Today, several historians (like John C. G. Röhl, Martin Warren and David Hunt) defend the thesis that Charlotte suffered from porphyria as did her maternal ancestor King George III. This could explain the gastrointestinal problems, migraines and nervous crises that tormented the princess. The same historians believe that the headaches and skin rashes that Victoria treated with doses of morphine were also a consequence of porphyria, albeit in a weaker form than that suffered by Charlotte.

=== Matrimonial projects: sources of conflict ===
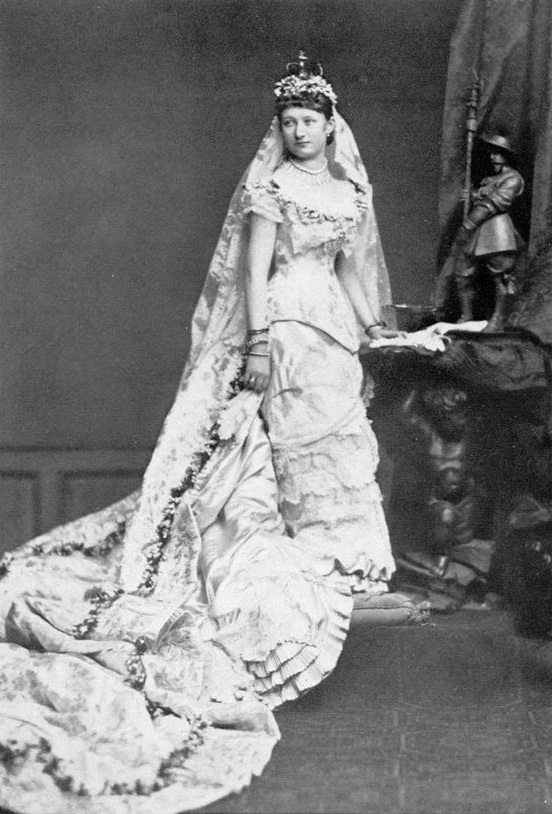
Augusta Victoria of Schleswig-Holstein, as a bride of Prince William, 1881

As her children became adults, Victoria began to seek suitors for them. In 1878, Charlotte married her paternal second cousin Bernhard, Hereditary Prince of Saxe-Meiningen, which delighted the Berlin court. Three years later, Victoria began negotiations to marry William to Princess Augusta Victoria of Schleswig-Holstein, provoking outrage in conservative German circles. Chancellor Bismarck criticised the project because the princess belonged to the family who was dethroned by Prussia with the annexation of the duchies of Schleswig and Holstein in 1864. The Hohenzollerns considered Augusta Victoria unworthy to marry the second-in-line to the German Empire because her family lacked sufficient rank. After several months of negotiations, Victoria got what she wanted but soon became disappointed when she saw that her daughter-in-law did not have the liberal personality that she expected.

The crown princess, however, was not so lucky with the marriage plans for her daughter Viktoria. In 1881, she fell in love with Prince Alexander I of Bulgaria and her mother tried to obtain permission from the emperor for the engagement. Despite being a sovereign, the Bulgarian prince was born of a morganatic marriage, which placed him in a position of inferiority in front of the proud House of Hohenzollern. In addition, Alexander's policy in his Principality of Bulgaria was greatly disliked by Russia, a traditional ally of Prussia. Bismarck feared that marriage between a German princess and an enemy of Tsar Alexander III of Russia would represent a blow to the League of the Three Emperors, the Austro-German-Russian alliance. The chancellor meanwhile, gained the disapproval of William I to the union, much to the dismay of Victoria and Frederick.

This new conflict between father and son resulted in the emperor replacing the crown prince with Prince William at official ceremonies and major events. On several occasions, it was the grandson of William I who represented the Berlin court abroad.

== German Empress ==
=== Agony of William I and Frederick III's disease ===
In 1887, the health of the 90-year-old William I declined rapidly, indicating that the succession was close. However, the crown prince was also ill. Increasingly sickly, Frederick was told that he had laryngeal cancer. To confirm his suspicions, Frederick was examined by British physician Morell Mackenzie, who after a biopsy did not find any sign of illness.

With the agreement of his physicians, Frederick went with his wife to Great Britain for the Golden Jubilee of Queen Victoria in June 1887. On that trip, the couple secretly brought to Windsor Castle three boxes full of personal documents that they wanted to keep away from the eyes of Bismarck and the Hohenzollerns. Always eager to harm the crown prince, the imperial chancellor continued his intrigues against Victoria. With the help of Chamberlain Hugo von Radolin and the painter Götz de Seckendorff, he tried to prepare a final report against her.

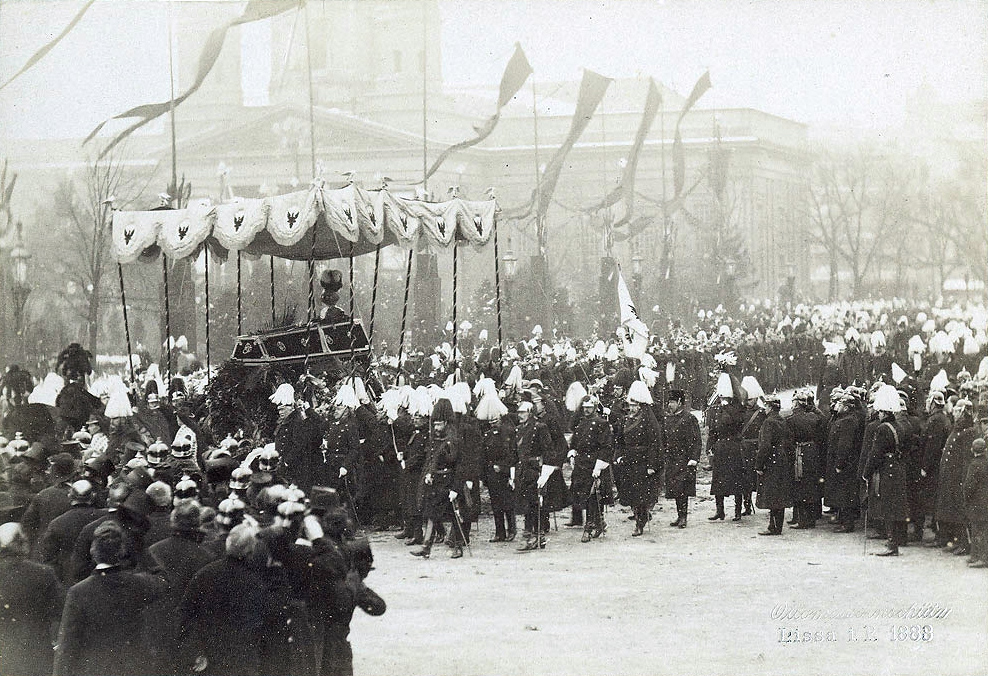
Emperor William I's funeral procession

Because the health of the crown prince did not improve, Mackenzie advised him to go to Italy to undergo treatment. Frederick and Victoria went to San Remo in September 1887, causing outrage in Berlin because, despite the continued deterioration in the emperor's health, the couple did not return to the capital. In early November, Frederick completely lost the use of speech, and German doctors were summoned by Victoria to San Remo for further examinations. Finally, he was diagnosed with a malignant tumour, for which the only possible treatment was the removal of his larynx, but the crown prince refused. Victoria supported her husband in his decision, which caused a serious argument with her son William, who shortly before had arrived in Italy and accused his mother of being happy with Frederick's disease.

In Berlin, the agony of William I lasted several months until, on 9 March 1888, the first German emperor finally died. His son succeeded him as king of Prussia and German emperor under the name of Frederick III.

=== Empress of 99 days ===
Immediately after accession, Emperor Frederick III appointed his wife as Lady of the Order of the Black Eagle, the highest order of chivalry in the Kingdom of Prussia. However, after her return to Berlin, she realised that she and her husband in fact were really "shadows ready to be replaced by William".

Gravely ill, Frederick III limited his political actions to some symbolic measures, such as declaring an amnesty to all political prisoners and the dismissal of the reactionary Interior Minister Robert von Puttkamer. He also awarded the Order of the Black Eagle to various people who had supported and advised him when he was still crown prince, like Justice Minister Heinrich von Friedberg and Frankfurt Parliament President Eduard von Simson.

Victoria tried to use her new status to promote the marriage of her daughter Viktoria to Prince Alexander I of Bulgaria (abandoned since 1886). However, given the difficulties caused by the project, she advised her daughter to give up on the marriage.

=== Death of Frederick III and consequences ===
Frederick III died about 11:00 on 15 June 1888. Once the emperor's death was announced, his son and successor William II ordered the occupation of the imperial residence by soldiers. The chambers of Frederick and Victoria were carefully checked for incriminating documents. However, the search was unsuccessful because all the couple's correspondence had been taken to Windsor Castle the previous year. Several years later, William II stated that the purpose of this research was to find state documents. Currently, however, many historians (as Hannah Pakula and Franz Herre) suggest that what the emperor wanted was to recover documents that could threaten his reputation.

Emperor Frederick III's funeral procession

The funeral of Frederick III came shortly after in Potsdam, without major pomp. Victoria, now empress dowager, did not appear at the ceremony in the Friedenskirche of Sanssouci, but attended a service in memory of her husband at the Bornstedt Crown Estate. From the death of her husband, she became known as Empress Frederick, as her mother-in-law, empress dowager Augusta, was still alive until 1890.

In the following weeks, William II purged all institutions and people close to his parents. The home of the lawyer Franz von Roggenbach was searched and the widow of Ernst von Stockmar, Empress Frederick's former private secretary, was questioned by the police. Friedrich Heinrich Geffcken, Frederick III's counsellor for years, was tried for high treason for publishing excerpts from the diary of Emperor Frederick. Finally, Heinrich von Friedberg was dismissed as Justice Minister.

== Empress dowager ==
=== Resettlement ===
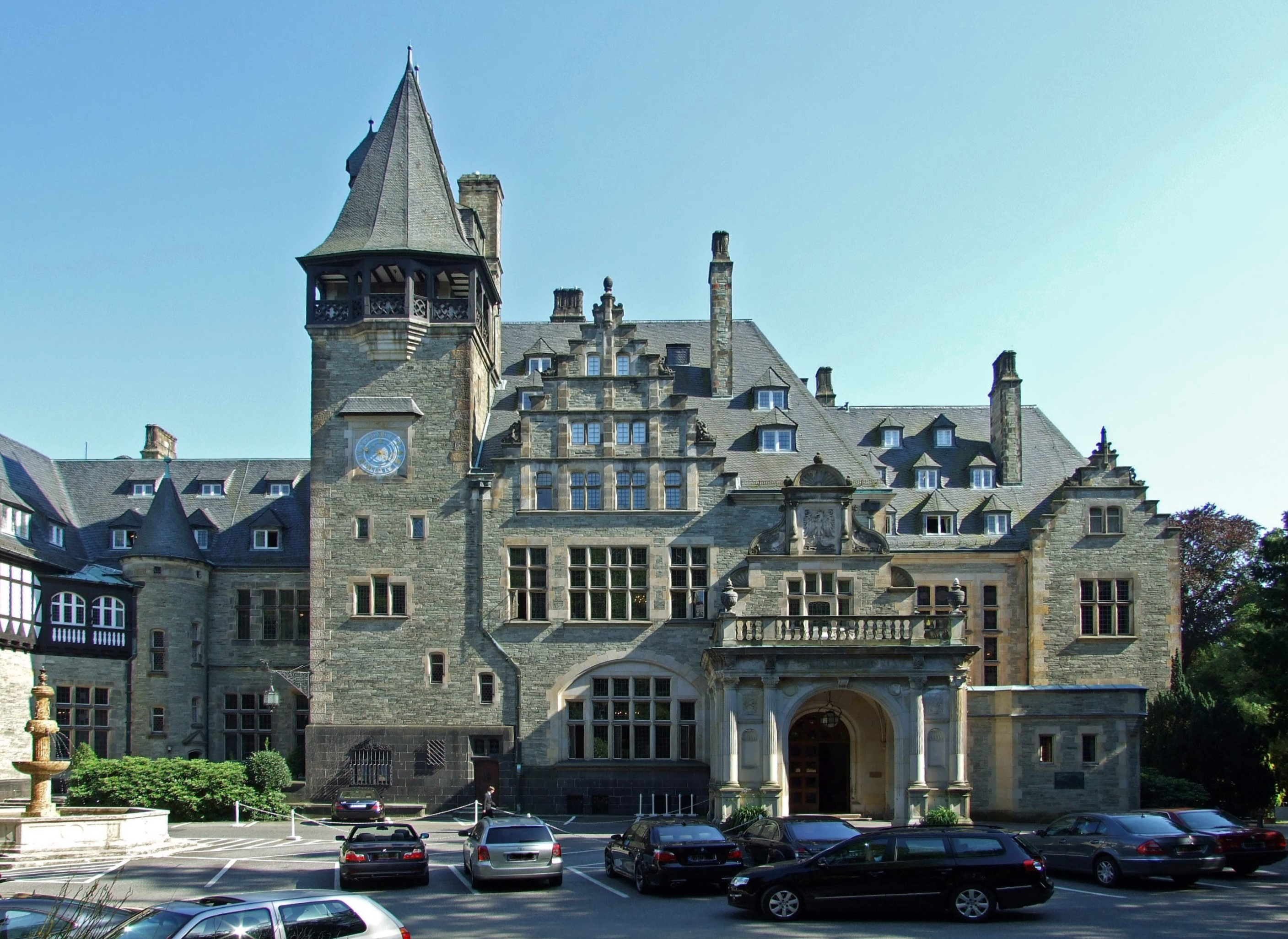
Friedrichshof, residence of Empress Victoria as a widow

Once widowed, Empress Frederick had to leave the Neues Palais in Potsdam because her son wanted to settle his residence there. Unable to settle in Sanssouci, she acquired a property in Kronberg im Taunus, in the old Duchy of Nassau. There, she built a castle that was named Friedrichshof in honour of her husband. Having inherited several million marks after the death of the wealthy Maria de Brignole-Sale, Duchess of Galliera, the empress dowager was able to finance the construction and expansion of her residence. With the completion of the works in 1894, she spent most of the year in the property with her younger daughters, and left only when she travelled abroad. Contrary to the desires of the emperor, who preferred that she leave Germany permanently, Empress Frederick formed her own court and maintained close relations with liberal circles.

=== Solitude ===
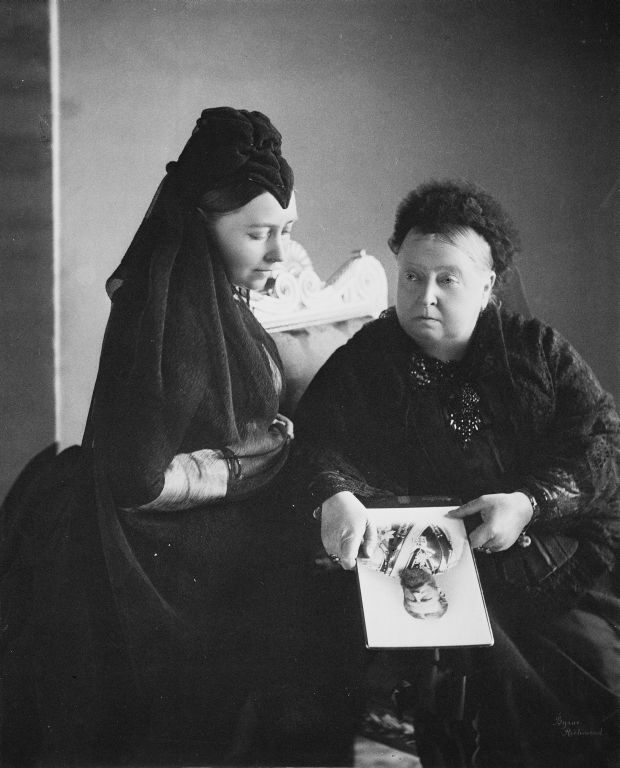
Empress Frederick with her mother Queen Victoria, 1889

In October 1889, Princess Sophia, the empress dowager's penultimate daughter, married the future King Constantine I of Greece, leaving the maternal residence. The following year, Princess Viktoria, after the ending of her hopes to wed the ruler of Bulgaria, in the end married Prince Adolf of Schaumburg-Lippe, the future regent of the Principality of Lippe. Finally, in 1893, Princess Margaret married Prince Frederick Charles of Hesse, who in 1918 was elected to the throne of the ephemeral Kingdom of Finland. Although satisfied with these marriages, the empress dowager felt increasingly isolated following the departure of her daughters.

In fact, Empress Frederick was completely sequestered from public life by Wilhelm II. With the death of her mother-in-law, Empress Dowager Augusta in 1890, Empress Frederick had hopes to succeed her as patron of the German Red Cross and the Vaterländischer Frauenverein (Association of Patriotic Women). However, it was her daughter-in-law, Empress Augusta Victoria, who assumed the presidency of these entities, which caused a deep bitterness in Empress Frederick.

The empress dowager did not hesitate to harshly criticise the policies and behaviour of her son. When the emperor wrote in the guestbook of the city of Munich the words "Suprema lex regis voluntas" (The will of the king is the supreme law"), she indignantly wrote to her mother:

The Tsar, an infallible Pope, a Bourbon or our poor Charles I might have pronounced that phrase, but a monarch of the 19th century ... My God, I think (...) Fritz's son and the grandson of my dear father took such a direction and also misunderstood the principles with which it is still possible to govern.

=== Later years and death ===
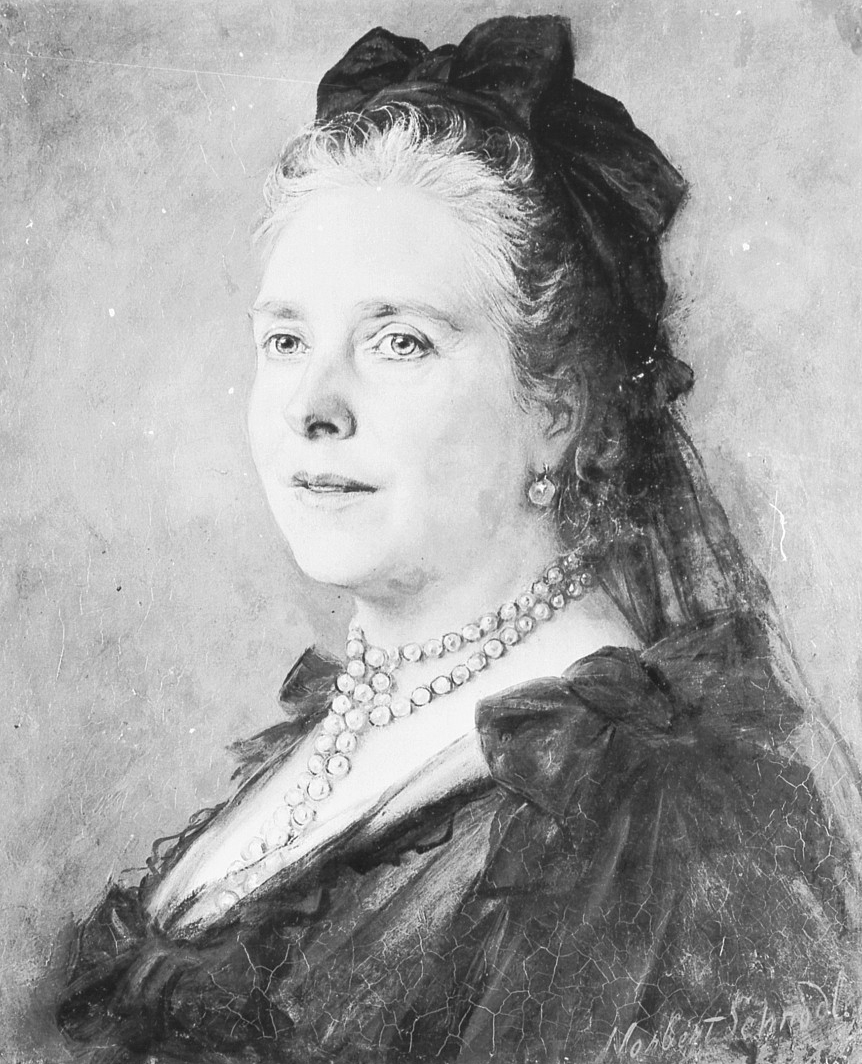
Portrait by Norbert Schrödl, 1900

Empress Frederick devoted part of her final years to painting and to visiting the artists' colony of Kronberg, where she regularly met with the painter Norbert Schrödl. In her last days, she used to walk in the morning and spent long hours writing letters or reading in the library of her castle.

In late 1898, physicians diagnosed the empress dowager with inoperable breast cancer, forcing her to stay in bed for long periods. Cancer had spread to her spine by the autumn of 1900, and as she worried about her personal letters (in which she detailed her concern over Germany's future under her son) falling into the hands of the emperor, she requested that the letters be brought back to Great Britain in a cloak-and-dagger operation by her godson Frederick Ponsonby, the private secretary of her brother, Edward VII, who was making his final visit to his terminally ill sister in Kronberg on 23 February 1901. These letters were later edited by Ponsonby and put into context by his background commentary to form the book that was published in 1928. (Note: The 'cloak-and-dagger operation', Ponsonby's position as her godson and the background to his decision to publish the letters are described in Letters of the Empress Frederick on pp. ix–xix.)

Emperor Frederick III and Empress Victoria mausoleum at the Friedenskirche, Sanssouci

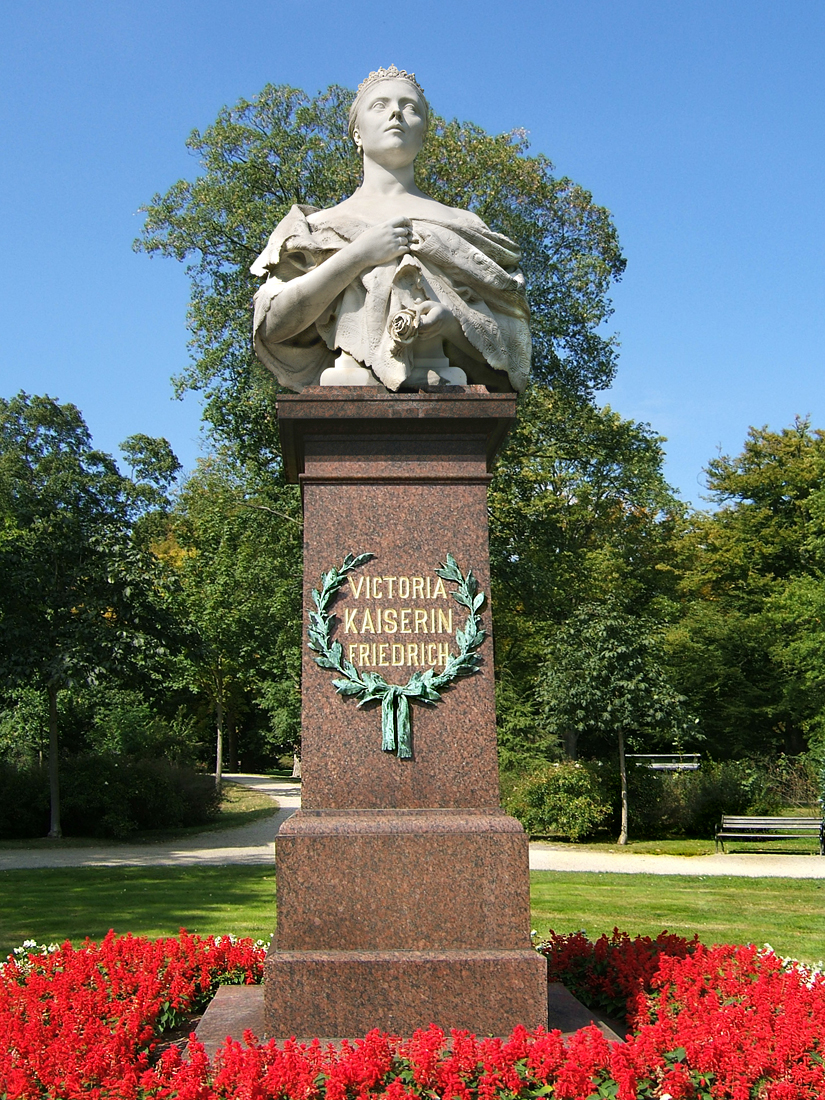
Monument to Victoria by Joseph Uphues, 1902, in Spa gardens in Bad Homburg vor der Höhe

The empress dowager died in Friedrichshof on 5 August 1901, less than seven months after the death of her mother.

Empress Frederick was buried next to her husband in the royal mausoleum of the Friedenskirche at Potsdam on 13 August 1901. Her tomb has a recumbent marble effigy of herself on top. Her two sons who died in childhood, Sigismund and Waldemar, are buried in the same mausoleum.

== Archives ==
Victoria's entire correspondence, which she left to her youngest daughter Margaret, is preserved in the Archive of the House of Hesse, which is kept in Fasanerie Palace in Eichenzell, Germany.

== Memorials, dedications, and in popular culture ==
=== Geography ===
- The Mount Victoria in Jervis Inlet, British Columbia, Canada, was named in honour of the Princess Royal.
- The Princess Royal Reach is a fjord of Jervis Inlet also named after Victoria in 1860.
- The Princess Royal Colliery in the Forest of Dean was named in her honour.

=== Monument ===
- The Kaiserin-Friedrich-Gymnasium, secondary school in Bad Homburg vor der Höhe, Hesse, named after the empress.

=== Transport ===
- 3073 Princess Royal was a GWR 3031 (Achilles) Class locomotive, built by the Great Western Railway.

=== Horticulture ===
- The Empress Frederick is a variety of begonia double with flat petals and roses arranged around a single center.
- The Kronprinzessin Viktoria is a rose of type Bourbon created in 1888 by the rose breeders Vollert.
- The Kaiserin Friedrich is a variety of rose noisetee created in 1889 by Drögeüller.

=== Film and television ===
- Felicity Kendal played Victoria in Edward the Seventh (1975).
- Other portrayals include Gemma Jones (Fall of Eagles, 1974) and Ruth Hellberg (Bismarck, 1940), as well as Catherine Punch in the German mini-series (Bismarck, 1990). While she is portrayed as a naive English princess in the Bismarck works, the German film Vicky – die vergessene Kaiserin (The Forgotten Empress) tries to show her in a different light.
- Louisa Bay portrays an 8-to-12-year-old Princess Victoria in the third season of Victoria.
  - Hallie Woodhall portrays a younger Princess Victoria in the second season.

== Honours ==
- United Kingdom:
  - VA: Royal Order of Victoria and Albert, 1st Class, 10 February 1862
  - CI: Companion of the Crown of India, 1 January 1878
  - RRC: Member of the Royal Red Cross
  - DStJ: Lady of Justice of St. John
- Kingdom of Bavaria: Cross of Merit for 1870/71
- (Saxe-Coburg and Gotha) (Duchy of Saxe-Altenburg) (Saxe-Meiningen) Ernestine duchies: Grand Cross of the Saxe-Ernestine House Order
- Grand Duchy of Hesse: Dame of the Golden Lion, 24 May 1888
- Mexican Empire: Grand Cross of St. Charles, 10 April 1865
- Kingdom of Prussia:
  - Dame of the Order of Louise, 1st Division
  - Cross of Merit for Women and Girls, 26 June 1871
  - Dame of the Black Eagle, with Collar, 9 March 1888
  - Red Cross Medal, 1st Class, 22 October 1898
- Kingdom of Portugal: Dame of the Order of Queen Saint Isabel, 31 August 1857
- Russian Empire: Grand Cross of St. Catherine, January 1858
- Kingdom of Saxony: Dame of the Order of Sidonia, with Grand Cross, 1871
- Spain: Dame of the Order of Queen Maria Luisa, 25 January 1878
- Württemberg: Dame of the Order of Olga, 1871

=== Arms ===
With her style of Princess Royal, Victoria was granted use of the royal arms, as then used: with an escutcheon of the shield of Saxony, the whole differenced by a label argent of three points, the outer points bearing crosses gules, the central a rose gules.

Victoria's coat of arms as Princess Royal of the United Kingdom	Lesser coat of arms of Empress Victoria	Monogram as Princess Royal of the United Kingdom	Monogram as German Empress

== Issue ==
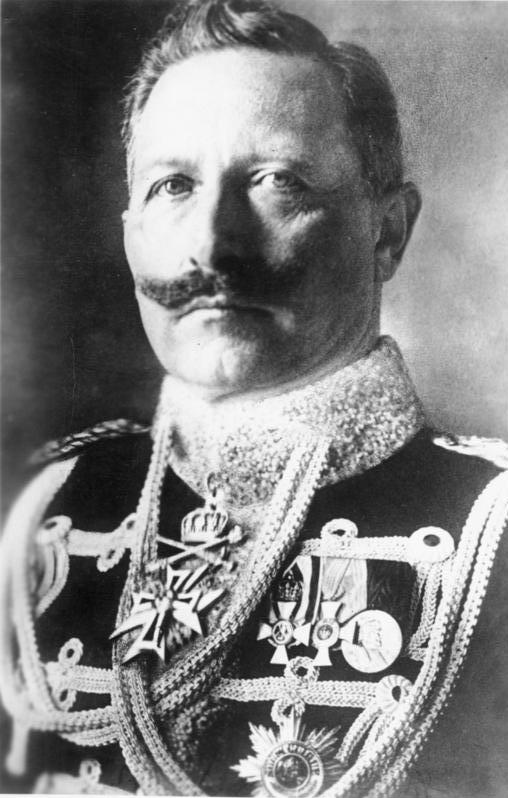
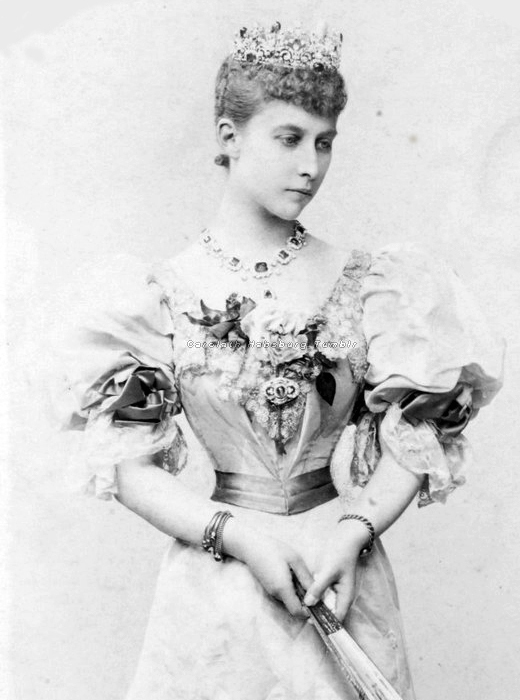
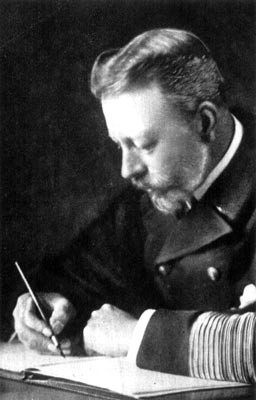
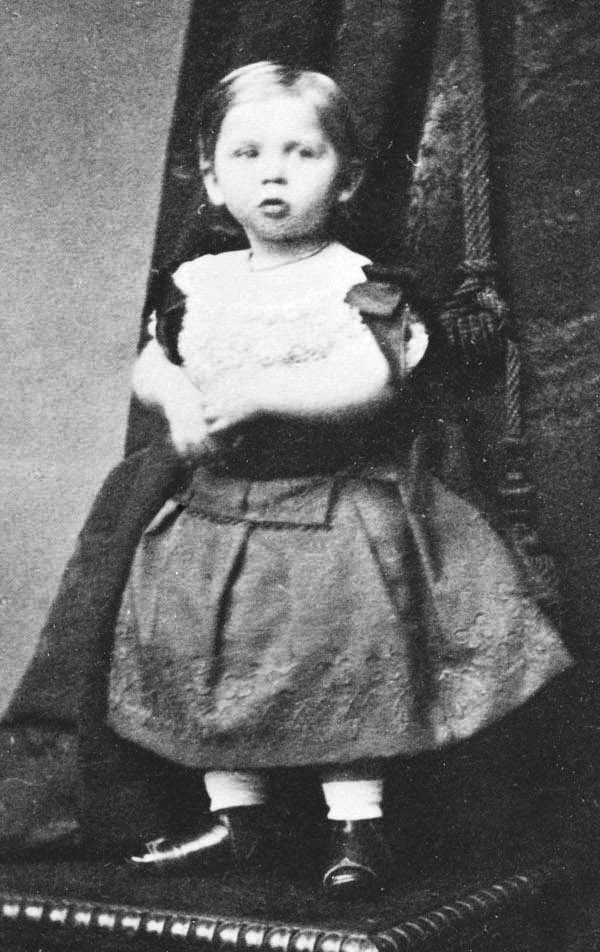
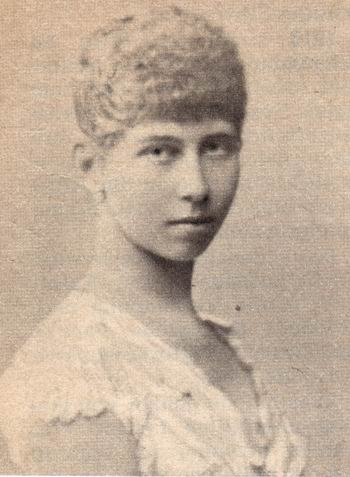
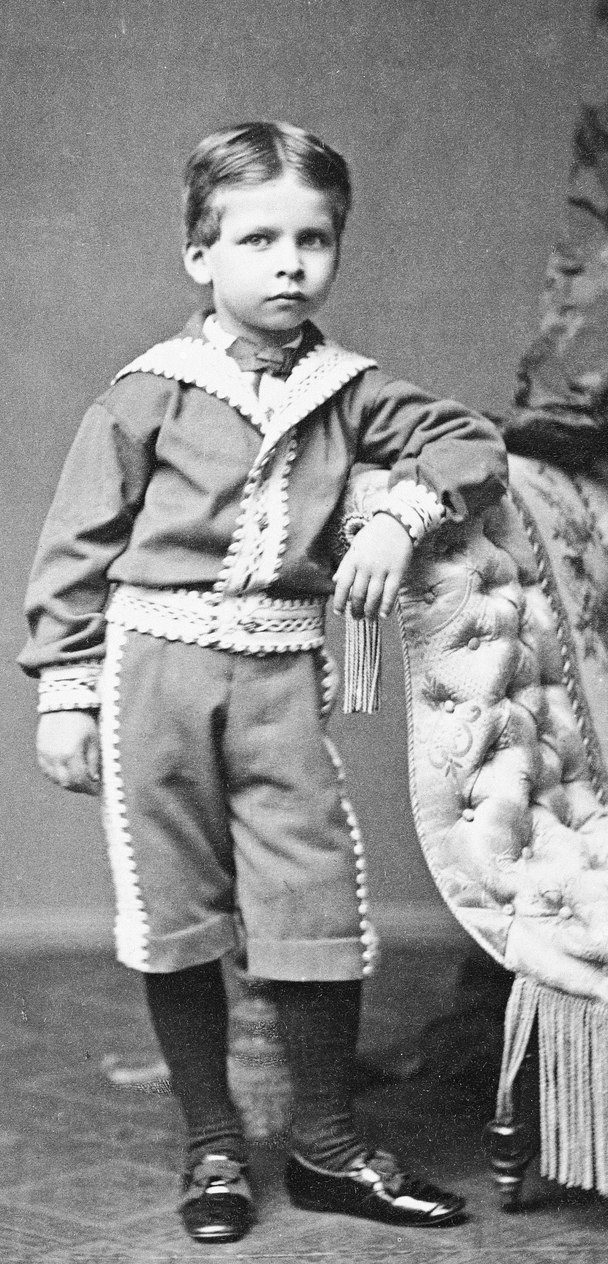
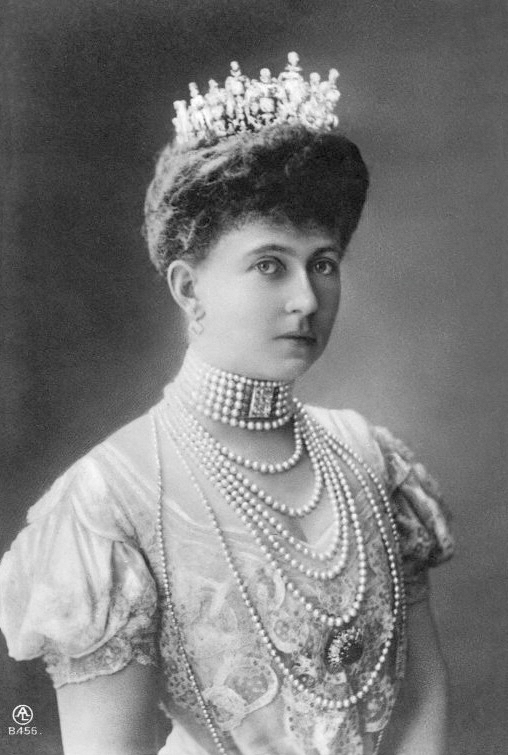
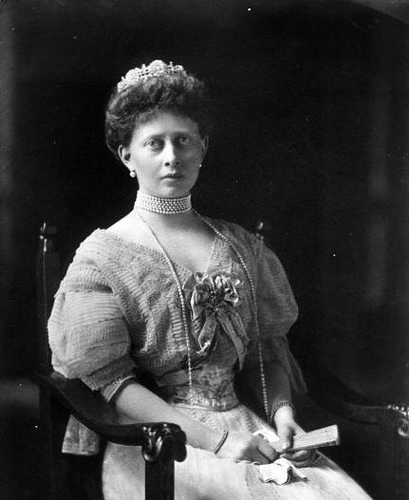
Image	Name	Birth	Death	Notes
	Wilhelm II, German Emperor and King of Prussia	27 January 1859	4 June 1941	married (1), 27 February 1881, Princess Augusta Victoria of Schleswig-Holstein-Sonderburg-Augustenburg; died 1921; had 6 sons; 1 daughter (2), 9 November 1922, Princess Hermine Reuss of Greiz, no issue
	Charlotte, Duchess of Saxe-Meiningen	24 July 1860	1 October 1919	married, 18 February 1878, Bernhard III, Duke of Saxe-Meiningen; had 1 daughter
	Prince Henry of Prussia	14 August 1862	20 April 1929	married, 24 May 1888, his first cousin Princess Irene of Hesse and by Rhine; had 3 sons
	Prince Sigismund of Prussia	15 September 1864	18 June 1866	died of meningitis at 21 months; the first grandchild of Queen Victoria to die.
	Viktoria, Princess Adolf of Schaumburg-Lippe	12 April 1866	13 November 1929	married (1), 19 November 1890, Prince Adolf of Schaumburg-Lippe; he died 1916; no issue (2), 19 November 1927, Alexander Zoubkov; no issue
	Prince Waldemar of Prussia	10 February 1868	27 March 1879	died of diphtheria at age 11
	Sophia, Queen of the Hellenes	14 June 1870	13 January 1932	married, 27 October 1889, Constantine I, King of the Hellenes; had 3 sons; 3 daughters (including: George II, King of the Hellenes; Alexander I, King of the Hellenes; Paul, King of the Hellenes; and Helen, Queen Mother of Romania)
	Margaret, Landgravine of Hesse	22 April 1872	22 January 1954	married, 25 January 1893, Prince Frederick Charles of Hesse, later Landgrave of Hesse; had 6 sons

== Ancestry ==
Ancestors of Victoria, Princess Royal

8. Francis, Duke of Saxe-Coburg-Saalfeld (= 14)
4. Ernest I, Duke of Saxe-Coburg and Gotha
9. Countess Augusta Reuss of Ebersdorf (= 15)
2. Prince Albert of Saxe-Coburg and Gotha
10. Augustus, Duke of Saxe-Gotha-Altenburg
5. Princess Louise of Saxe-Gotha-Altenburg
11. Duchess Louise Charlotte of Mecklenburg-Schwerin
1. Victoria, Princess Royal
12. George III of the United Kingdom
6. Prince Edward, Duke of Kent and Strathearn
13. Duchess Charlotte of Mecklenburg-Strelitz
3. Victoria of the United Kingdom
14. Francis, Duke of Saxe-Coburg-Saalfeld (= 8)
7. Princess Victoria of Saxe-Coburg-Saalfeld
15. Countess Augusta Reuss of Ebersdorf (= 9)

== Bibliography ==
- Jean Bérenger: Histoire de l'Empire des Habsbourg 1273-1918, Fayard 1990 ISBN 2-213-02297-6
- Catherine Clay: Le roi, l'empereur et le tsar – Les trois cousins qui ont entraîné le monde dans la guerre, Librairie Académique Perrin (French translation), 2008 ISBN 2-262-02855-9.
- Christopher Dobson (ed.): Chronicle of England, Chronique ed. (French translation), 1998. ISBN 2905969709
- Engelberg, Ernest (1985). Bismarck – Urpreuße und Reichsgründer. Berlin: Siedler ed. ISBN 3-88680-121-7..
- Karin Feuerstein-Praßer: Die deutschen Kaiserinnen. 1871–1918. Piper Verlag, München 2005. ISBN 3-492-23641-3.
- Herre, Franz (2006). Kaiserin Friedrich – Victoria, eine Engländerin in Deutschland. Stuttgart: Hohenheim Verlag. ISBN 3-89850-142-6..
- Pakula, Hannah (1995). An Uncommon Woman: The Empress Frederick, Daughter of Queen Victoria, Wife of the Crown Prince of Prussia, Mother of Kaiser Wilhelm. New York: Simon and Schuster. ISBN 0-684-84216-5..
- Kollander, Patricia (1995). Frederick III – Germany's Liberal Emperor. Westport: Greenwood Press. ISBN 0-313-29483-6..
- Massie, Robert K. (1991). Dreadnought: Britain, Germany and the Coming of the Great War. New York: Random House..
- Wolfgang Mommsen: War der Kaiser an allem schuld – Wilhelm II. und die preußisch-deutschen Machteliten, Berlin, Ullstein ed, 2005 ISBN 3-548-36765-8.
- Ponsonby, Sir Frederick (ed.), Letters of the Empress Frederick, London: Macmillan & Co., 1928.
- Ponsonby, Sir Frederick (Ed.), Briefe der Kaiserin Friedrich. Eingeleitet von Wilhelm II., Verlag für Kulturpolitik, Berlin 1929; [Letters of Empress Friedrich. Introduction by Wilhelm II] new edition: H. Knaur Verlag, München, ISBN 5-19-977337-2.
- Wilfried Rogasch (Hrsg.): Victoria & Albert, Vicky & The Kaiser: ein Kapitel deutsch-englischer Familiengeschichte [Cat. of the Exhibition in the Deutsches Historisches Museum Berlin] Hatje Verlag, Ostfildern-Ruit 1997. ISBN 3-86102-091-2.
- Röhl, John C. G. (1988). Kaiser, Hof und Staat – Wilhelm II. und die deutsche Politik (in German). Munich: Beck. ISBN 3-406-32358-8. OL 13962777M.
- Sinclair, Andrew (1987). Victoria – Kaiserin für 99 Tage. Marz: ustav Lübbe Verlag, Bergisch Gladbach. ISBN 3-404-61086-5..
- Kurt Tetzeli von Rosador and Arndt Mersmann (ed.): Queen Victoria – Ein biographisches Lesebuch aus ihren Briefen und Tagebüchern, Munich, Deutscher Taschenbuchverlag, 2001. ISBN 3-423-12846-1
- Van Der Kiste, John (2001). Dearest Vicky, Darling Fritz: Queen Victoria's Eldest Daughter and the German Emperor. Sutton Publishing. ISBN 0-750-93052-7..
- Thomas Weiberg: ... wie immer Deine Dona. Verlobung und Hochzeit des letzten deutschen Kaiserpaares. Isensee-Verlag, Oldenburg 2007, ISBN 978-3-89995-406-7.
- Wilson, A.N (2014). Victoria - A Life (Hardback). London: Atlantic Books. ISBN 978-1-84887-956-0..

Victoria, Princess Royal House of Saxe-Coburg and Gotha Cadet branch of the House of Wettin Born: 21 November 1840 Died: 5 August 1901
German royalty
Preceded by Augusta of Saxe-Weimar	German Empress consort Queen consort of Prussia; 9 March 1888 – 15 June 1888	Succeeded by Augusta Victoria of Schleswig-Holstein
British royalty
Vacant Title last held by Charlotte, Queen of Württemberg	Princess Royal; 1841–1901	Vacant Title next held by Princess Louise, Duchess of Fife
