= Heinrich von Angeli =

Austrian painter (1840–1925)

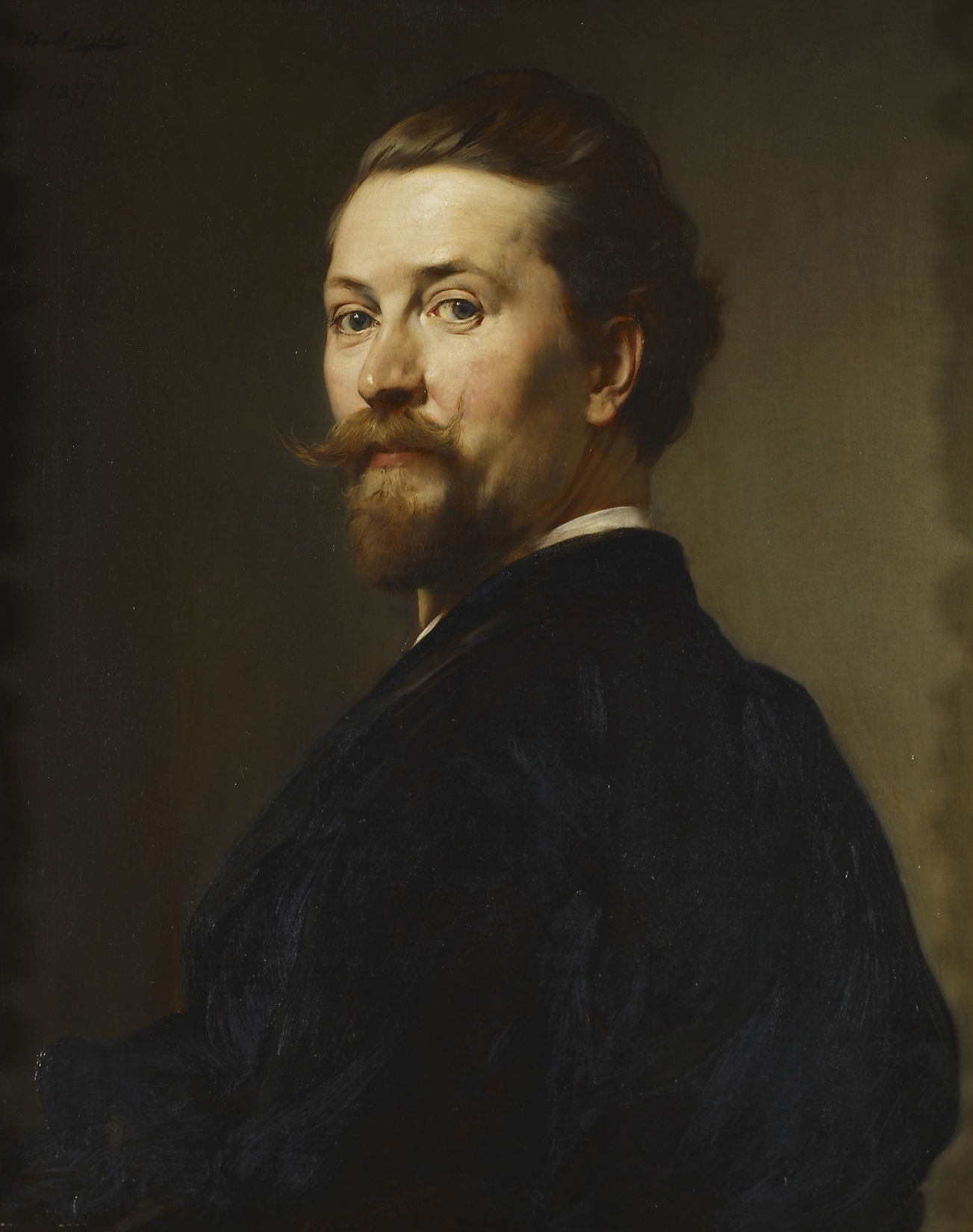
- Self-portrait (1877)
- Born: 8 July 1840; Ödenburg, Austrian Empire
- Died: 21 October 1925 (aged 85); Vienna, Austria
- Education: Academy of Fine Arts Vienna; Kunstakademie Düsseldorf
- Occupations: historian painter

Heinrich Anton von Angeli (8 July 1840 – 21 October 1925) was an Austrian historian and portrait painter.

== Life ==
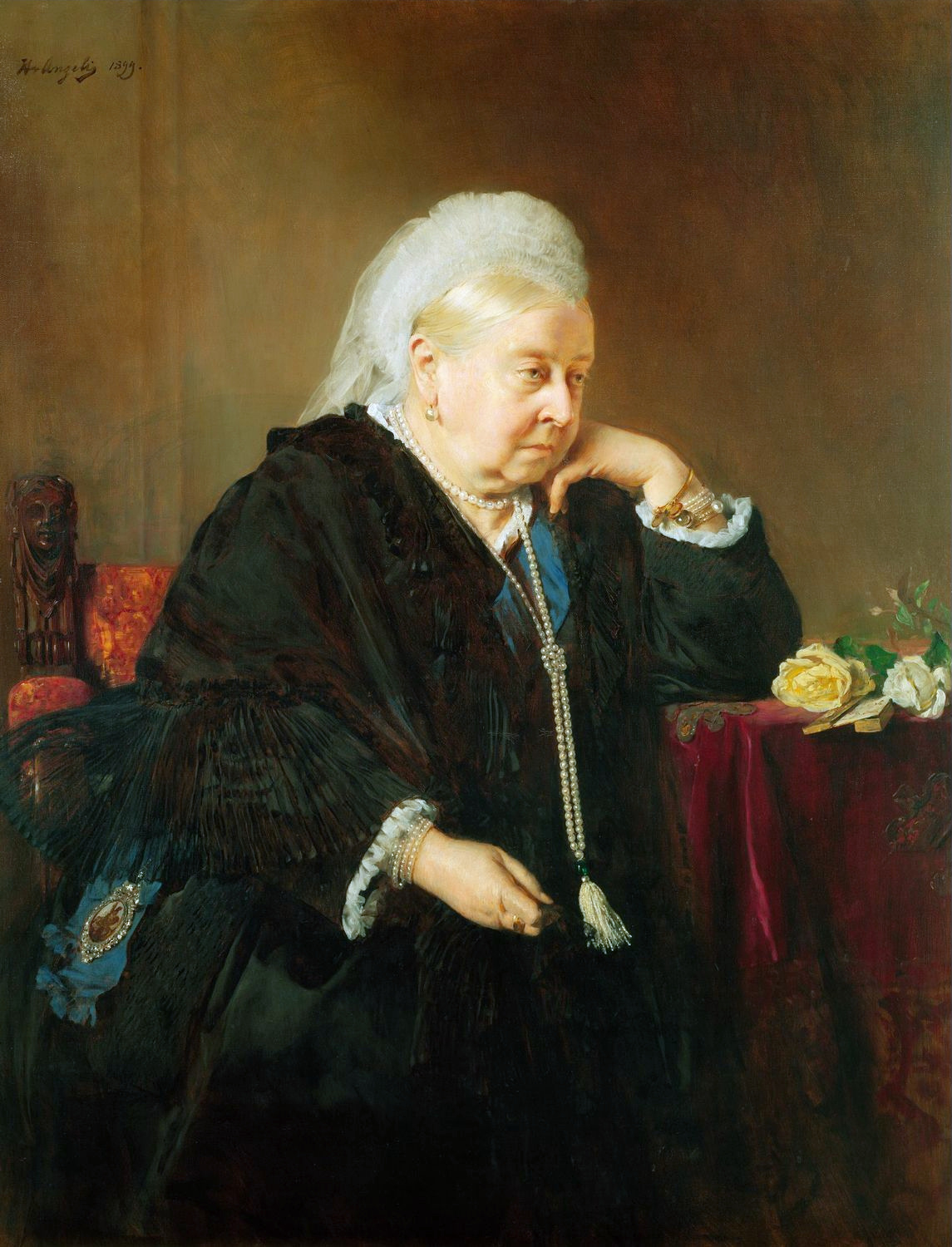
Angeli's portrait of Queen Victoria

The Angeli family was originally from Venice and was ennobled by the Holy Roman Emperor Maximilian II in 1565.

Angeli was born in 1840 in Ödenburg, then part of the Austrian Empire, now known as Sopron in Hungary. He studied at the Academy of Fine Arts Vienna, the Kunstakademie Düsseldorf, and in Munich, before moving back to Vienna in 1862. From 1870, he travelled between Berlin, London, and Vienna, producing portraits.

The success of Angeli at painting society portraits was partly due to his skill in depicting uniforms, pearls, and other jewels. Unlike painters such as Franz Xaver Winterhalter, Angeli worked in a naturalistic style and preferred to portray his sitters as they were. His 1875 portrait of Queen Victoria earned him praise from the monarch for its honesty. As well as royal figures and politicians, he painted other notable people, such as the German chemist August Wilhelm von Hofmann. In 1877, Buckingham Palace invited Ulysses S. Grant to have his portrait painted by Angeli.

Angeli's works included portraits of Queen Victoria, her eldest daughter Victoria, Princess Royal, Kaiser Wilhelm I, Benjamin Disraeli, Lord Kitchener, and two portraits of Princess Beatrice.

Several of Angeli's works are in the British Royal Collection, including portraits of members of the British, German, and Russian royal and imperial families. His work is also in the Wallace Collection and the Victoria and Albert Museum.

In 1915, Angeli was appointed to the German Order Pour le Mérite for Sciences and Arts. He died in Vienna in 1925.

== Bibliography ==
- Constantin von Wurzbach: "Angeli, Heinrich von" in Biographisches Lexikon des Kaiserthums Oesterreich. Vol 11, Verlag L. C. Zamarski, Vienna 1864, p. 354 (Online)
- Margarete Braun-Ronsdorf: "Angeli, Heinrich von" in Neue Deutsche Biographie. Vol 1, Duncker & Humblot, Berlin 1953, ISBN 3-428-00182-6, p. 288 (Online)
- "Angeli Heinrich von" in Österreichisches Biographisches Lexikon 1815–1950. Vol 1. Verlag der Österreichischen Akademie der Wissenschaften, Vienna 1957, p. 22. (Online)
- Elisabeth Newzella, Nicht so ernst, Majestät – Anekdoten aus dem Leben des Wiener Fürstenmalers Heinrich von Angeli, Verlag für Sammler, Graz 1990.
- "Angeli, Heinrich von". In: Ulrich Thieme, Felix Becker (Eds.): Allgemeines Lexikon der Bildenden Künstler von der Antike bis zur Gegenwart, Vol.1: Aa–Antonio de Miraguel. Wilhelm Engelmann, Leipzig 1907, pg.496 (Online)
