= Augusta of Saxe-Weimar-Eisenach =

German Empress from 1871 to 1888

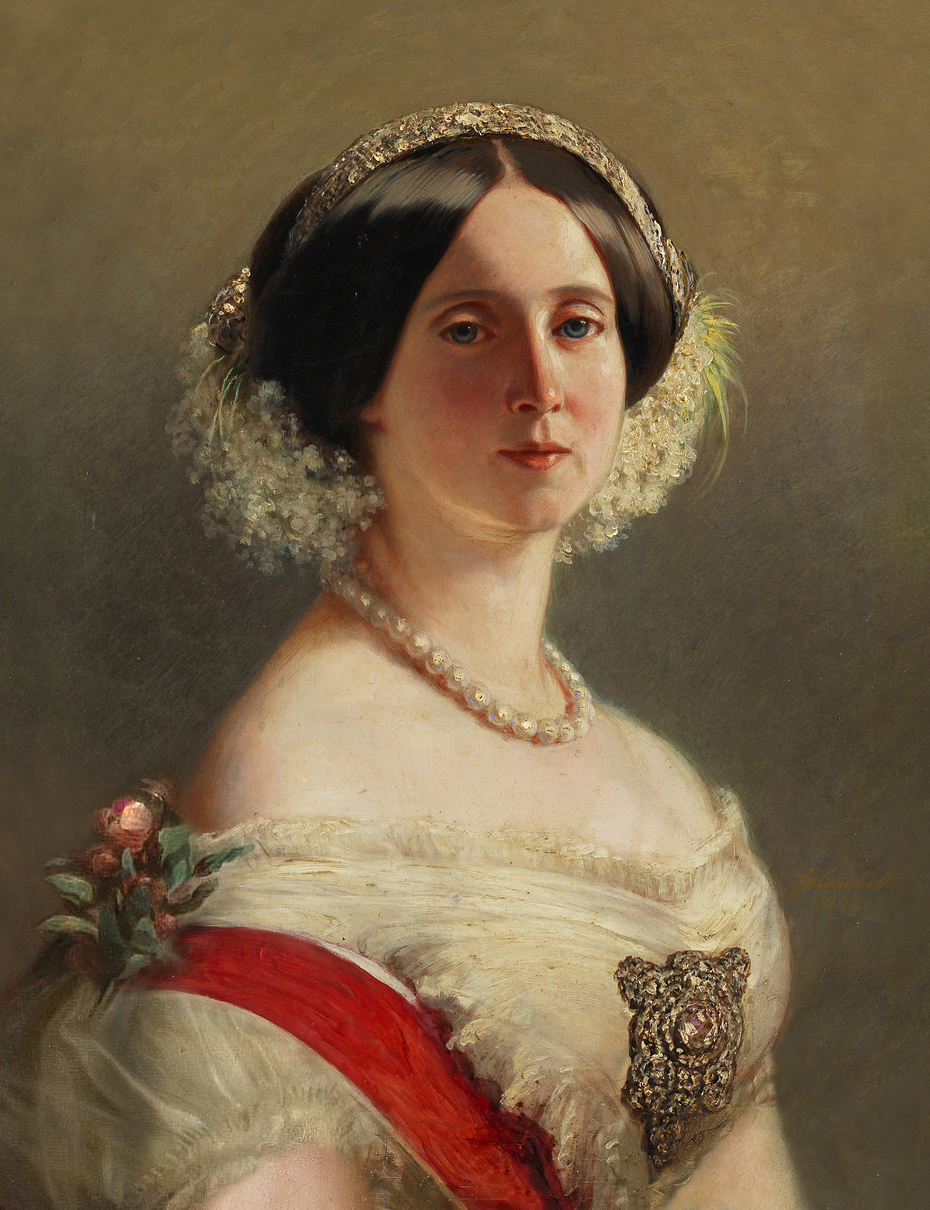
- Portrait by Franz Xaver Winterhalter, 1853.

Queen consort of Prussia
- Tenure: 2 January 1861 – 9 March 1888
- Coronation: 18 October 1861; Schlosskirche, Königsberg

German Empress consort
- Tenure: 18 January 1871 – 9 March 1888
- Born: 30 September 1811; Weimar, Saxe-Weimar-Eisenach
- Died: 7 January 1890 (aged 78); Berlin, Germany
- Burial: Mausoleum at Charlottenburg Palace
- Spouse: William I, German Emperor (m. 1829; died 1888)
- Issue: Frederick III, German Emperor; Louise, Grand Duchess of Baden
Names
- Maria Luise Augusta Katharina
- House: Saxe-Weimar-Eisenach
- Father: Charles Frederick, Grand Duke of Saxe-Weimar-Eisenach
- Mother: Grand Duchess Maria Pavlovna of Russia
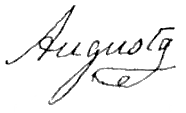
- Signature

Augusta of Saxe-Weimar-Eisenach (Maria Luise Augusta Katharina; 30 September 1811 – 7 January 1890), was Queen of Prussia and the first German Empress as the wife of William I, German Emperor.

A member of the Grand Ducal House of Saxe-Weimar-Eisenach and closely related to the Russian Imperial House of Romanov through her mother Grand Duchess Maria Pavlovna, in June 1829, Augusta married Prince William of Prussia. The marriage was tense; Wilhelm actually wanted to marry his cousin, Elisa Radziwiłł, who was judged to be unsuitable by the Prussian court, and the political views and intellectual interests of the two spouses were also far apart. Despite personal differences, Augusta and William often worked together to handle correspondence and social gatherings at court. In 1831 and 1838, they had two children, Frederick William and Louise. After the death of her father-in-law King Frederick William III of Prussia in 1840, Augusta became the wife of the heir presumptive to the Prussian throne.

It was not an official position that gave Augusta political influence, but rather her social relationships and dynastic proximity to William. An important role was played by extensive correspondence with her husband, other princes, statesmen, officers, diplomats, clergy, scientists and writers. She saw herself as her husband's political advisor and saw the Prussian Prime Minister and German Chancellor Otto von Bismarck as her main political enemy. While Bismarck biographies sometimes characterize the Empress's political views as anti-liberal or as destructive directed solely against Bismarck's policies, more recent research classifies them as liberal. Accordingly, Augusta did not succeed overall in convincing her husband to restructure Prussia and Germany along the lines of United Kingdom's constitutional monarchy. Nevertheless, she certainly had political leeway in raising the heir to the throne, as an advocate for the Catholic population and through her access to the king and anti-militaristic representation. Exactly how far Augusta's influence as a monarch's wife went in the 19th century is still being debated in historiography.

== Life ==
=== Childhood and youth (1811–1826): Shaped by the Weimar court ===
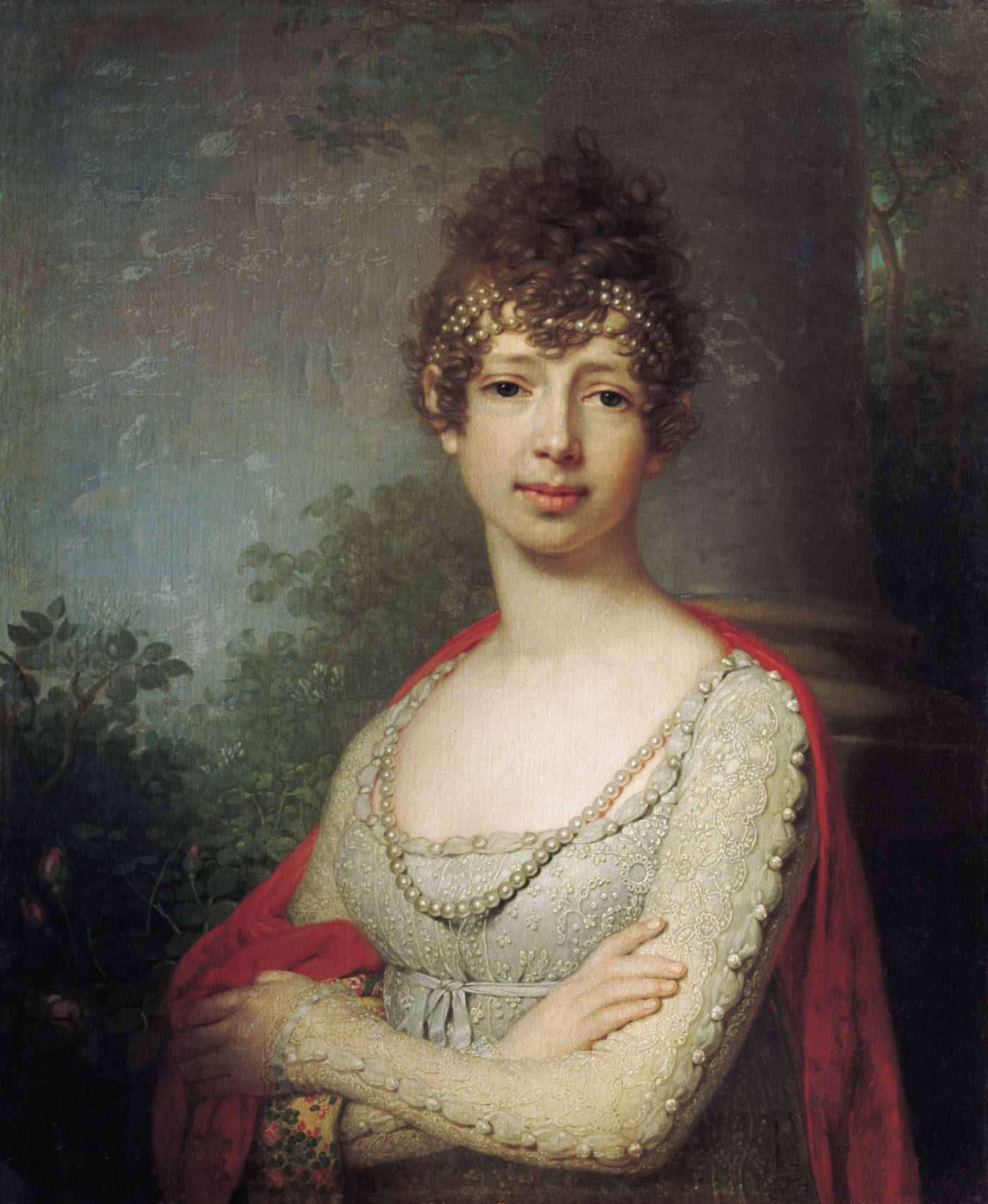
Augusta's mother Maria Pavlovna, a granddaughter of Catherine the Great, by Vladimir Borovikovsky, 1804.

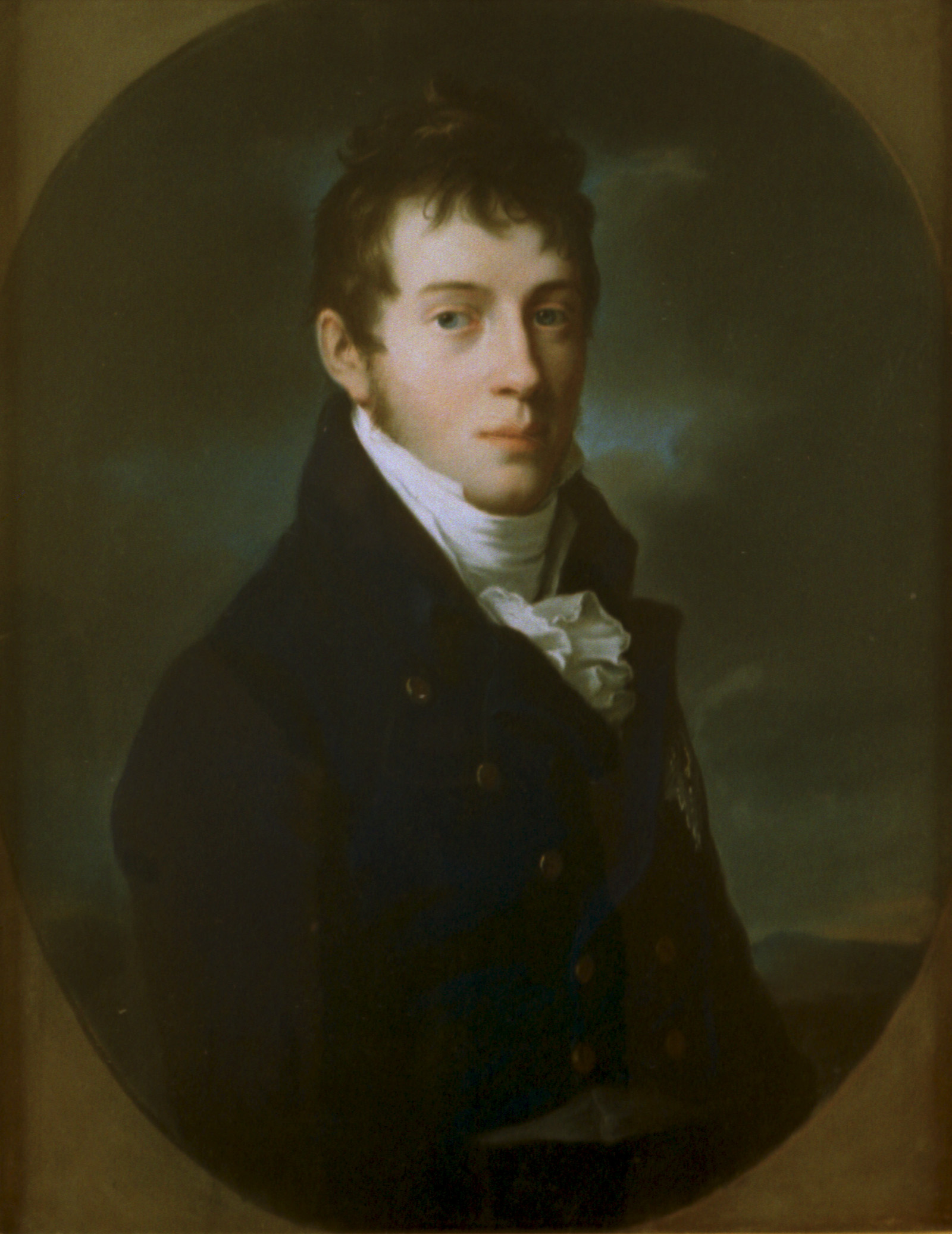
Augusta's father Charles Frederick, Grand Duke of Saxe-Weimar-Eisenach from 1828 to 1853, by Johann Friedrich August Tischbein, 1804.

Princess Augusta was born on 30 September 1811 in Weimar. She was the third (but second surviving) child of Charles Frederick, Hereditary Prince of Saxe-Weimar-Eisenach and Grand Duchess Maria Pavlovna, sister of Emperor (Tsar) Alexander I of Russia. The princess' baptism took place a few days later, on 6 October, with her full name being Maria Luise Augusta Catherina. (Note: Zeremoniell bei der Taufe der Prinzessin Maria Luise Augusta Katharina, geb. 30.9.1811, der späteren deutschen Kaiserin. in: Archive Portal of Thuringia, finding aid (Hofmarschallamt), last accessed on 21 February 2024 in archive-in-thueringen.de (in German). Deviating from this, the historian Detlef Jena gives the name Maria Louise Augusta Katharina.) As is usual with royal and princely families, Augusta grew up not primarily in the care of her parents, but rather with her nanny Amalia Batsch.

Her court teachers taught her four foreign languages: English, Russian, French and Latin. Additional subjects included mathematics, geography, religion, history, dancing, drawing, horse riding and music. Her teachers included specialists such as the court painter Luise Seidler, the composer Johann Nepomuk Hummel and the numismatist Frédéric Soret. However, the most important point of reference for Augusta was the poet and natural scientist Johann Wolfgang von Goethe. Goethe organized the teaching content in consultation with Augusta's parents and taught it in the environment of the University of Jena. For Augusta, looking back, Goethe was the "best, most dear friend" that she and her sister Maria Luise (who was three years older than her), would have had in their childhood. Both sisters hardly had any contact with their peers. According to the historian Lothar Gall, Augusta's political stance was shaped in the long term by her comparatively liberal family home. Her grandfather Karl August, Grand Duke of Saxe-Weimar-Eisenach had already introduced a constitution in the Grand Duchy in 1816. According to Monika Wienfort, this contributed to Augusta later advocating the transformation of Prussia into a constitutional monarchy. As Gall believes, the political climate in Weimar favored Augusta's later proximity to a circle in the so-called Wochenblattpartei, who advocated not only for a Lesser Germany unity without Austria, but also for an "alliance with the leading forces of the liberal bourgeoisie" and a continuation of the Prussian reforms. The GDR historian Ernst Engelberg, on the other hand, fundamentally denies Augusta's liberal stance: her political views are more likely to be located in the tradition of enlightened absolutism. She did not want to know anything about a "parliamentary regime", but rather advocated "a constitution freely chosen by the monarch".

The Weimar court also shaped Augusta from a cultural perspective. She developed a strong interest in art, was considered well-educated and was particularly strictly brought up to observe official court manners, the so-called etiquette.

=== Marriage to Prince William: Means of alliance politics and dynastic position ===
Augusta's mother, Maria Pavlovna, made marriage plans for both daughters towards Prussia, which bordered Saxony-Weimar-Eisenach on several sides and was therefore perceived as a threat to the Grand Duchy. The marriages of Augusta to Prince William and Marie to Prince Charles of Prussia, William's younger brother, were intended to ensure the continued existence of the Grand Duchy. Maria Pavlovna no longer considered the protection provided by family ties to the Romanov-Holstein-Gottorp dynasty to be sufficient. Since she became Grand Duchess herself in 1828, she was able to push ahead with marriage efforts. On the Prussian side, the motivation was to further expand the dynastic ties with Russia, because Augusta was a niece of Emperor Nicholas I. Since the joint victory over Napoleon, Prussia and Russia were particularly close in terms of alliance politics. A daughter of the Prussian King Frederick William III, Princess Charlotte, had already been married to Nicholas, Emperor Alexander I's second brother and eventual successor, in 1817.

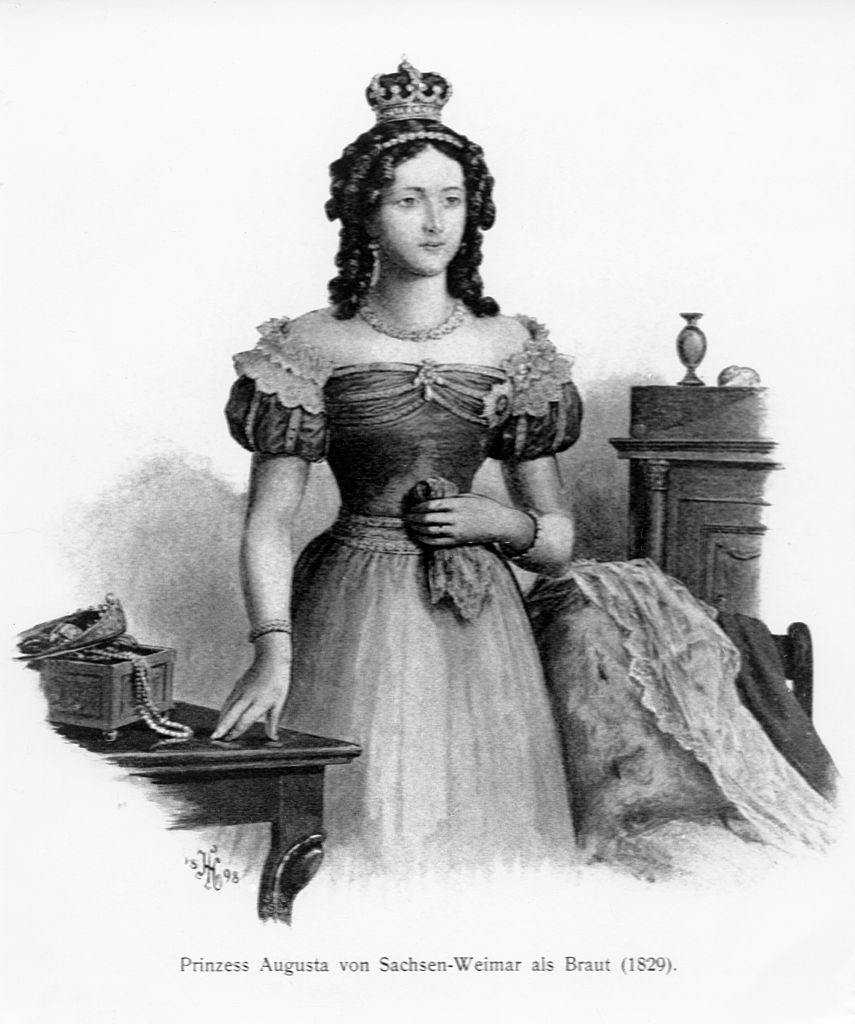
Augusta of Saxe-Weimar-Eisenach as a bride, ca. 1829.

Since his youth, Prince William, on the other hand, was in love with a former childhood playmate, his cousin Princess Elisa Radziwiłł, daughter of his first cousin twice removed Princess Louise. However, due to her paternal descent from the Polish noble family Radziwiłł, Elisa was not considered an equal. The Grand Duke of Saxe-Weimar-Eisenach made his consent to the marriage of William's younger brother Charles and his daughter Marie conditional on William only being allowed to enter into a morganatic marriage with Elisa. Frederick William III did not want such a connection, and therefore forbade his son to marry Elisa in June 1826. In the same year, William and Augusta met for the first time when Marie was engaged to Charles. Since it was now clear that William's older brother, the later Frederick William IV, would remain childless, William now had the task of producing legitimate dynastic offspring. This is how Frederick William III arranged a marriage between William and Augusta.

The Weimar princess saw several advantages in the connection. Before the marriage, Augusta, as the second-born daughter, held a lower rank at court than her older sister. Since the latter was only supposed to marry William's younger brother, Augusta would rank above Marie in Prussia and could expect to become the wife of the heir to the throne. The wedding took place on 11 June 1829 in the chapel at Schloss Charlottenburg. At this time, Augusta was 17 years old.

=== First years of marriage: Tense relationship with Wilhelm and birth of the children ===
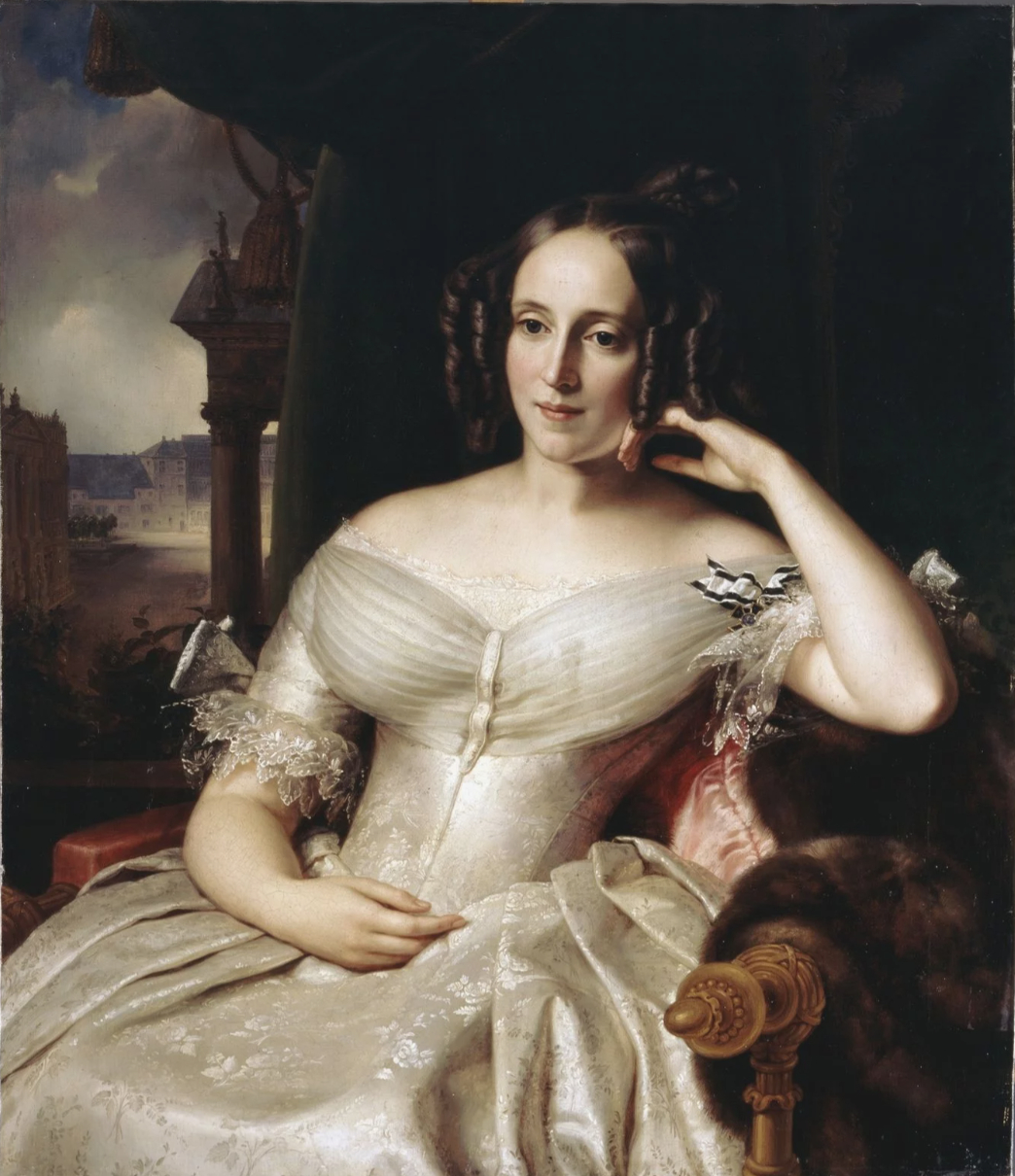
Princess Augusta, by Carl Joseph Begas, 1838. Klassik Stiftung Weimar, Weimar.

According to the historian Robert-Tarek Fischer, the marriage was tense for several reasons: On the one hand, William, who was 14 years older, made no secret of his continued affection for Elisa. On the other hand, Augusta's liberal views and intellectual interests were not shared by William and large parts of the Prussian court. As the historian Birgit Aschmann assumes, Augusta was also used to greater "cultural openness" from the Weimar court than was the case with the Hohenzollerns. From her husband's point of view, she didn't correspond enough to the bourgeois ideal of a woman. As William criticized in October 1829, she was more of a "woman of mind and not of heart". In doing so, Augusta violated the gender image of the time, according to which men had to be rational and women had to be emotional. According to the historian Jürgen Angelow, despite its political motivation, the marriage "was not quite as unhappy as it could have been". Over time, a relationship of trust and respect developed between the two. In her role as a Prussian princess, Augusta was expected to be reserved at the Berlin court. Deviating from this norm, however, she shared her views openly and was therefore later perceived as a political threat to her husband.

On 18 October 1831, Augusta gave birth to her son Frederick William. The succession of the Prussian royal house seemed assured by the birth. Augusta had a great influence on the upbringing of the future heir to the throne: Frederick William completed a military career, but was also taught natural sciences, philosophy, literature and classical studies according to a neo-humanistic curriculum. At his mother's instigation, his playmates included many middle-class high school students. Augusta encouraged her son to study at the University of Bonn —away from the influence of the Berlin court. Seven years passed until the second child, Louise, the later Grand Duchess of Baden, was born in Berlin on 3 December 1838. Louise was Augusta's last child, as her next two pregnancies, in 1842 and 1843, ended in miscarriages.

=== Courtly life: Conflicts, residence design and interaction with William ===
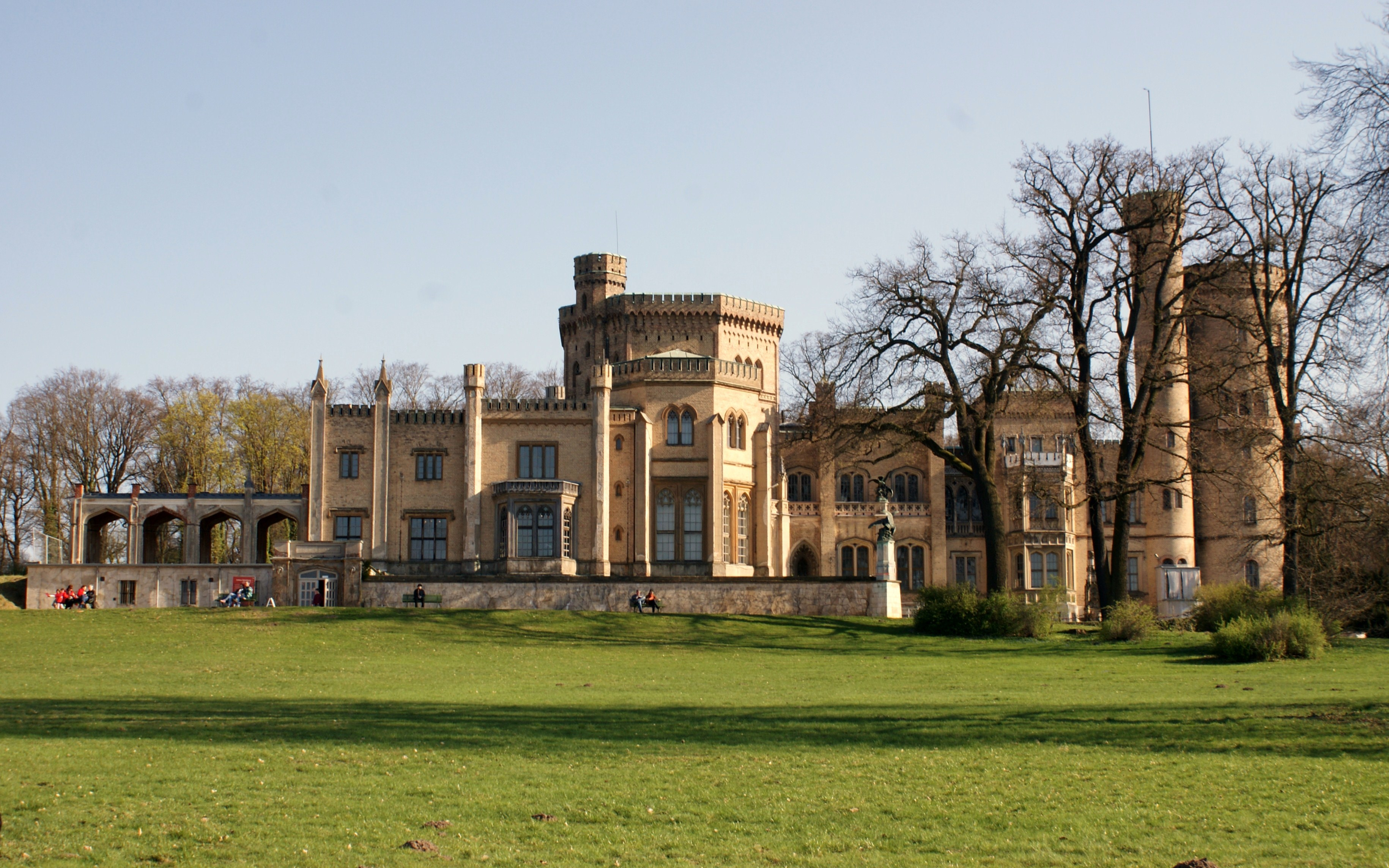
Schloss Babelsberg, Augusta's summer residence near Potsdam.

Augusta had a contentious relationship with the Prussian court. The courtly demeanor she practiced in Weimar was perceived as overly proud and aloof in Berlin and Potsdam. Augusta, for her part, disliked the court, which was culturally more frugal and more military-oriented compared to her homeland. She saw her position as increasingly useless and complained that only Crown Princess Elisabeth, the wife of the future King Frederick William IV, was allowed to do charitable work. In addition, she maintained contact less with the established Prussian noble families than with confidants, some of whom were viewed as "foreigners".

Augusta's summer residence since 1835 was Schloss Babelsberg near Potsdam. As a builder, she had some influence on the palace's construction: after studying architectural theoretical works and engravings of English country estates, she made sketches herself and asked the responsible architects to implement their designs. In the following years, Augusta also devoted herself to the interior design of the palace. With the English-inspired place and landscape garden, she expressed her sympathies for liberally governed Great Britain. Augusta also had a great influence on the interior design of her winter residence in Berlin, the Altes Palais. Here she invited military men, politicians, scientists, artists and courtiers to evening tea parties. One of their favorite guests was the explorer Alexander von Humboldt; there he reported on his travels or read classical literature. The antiquarian Ernst Curtius was often present as a speaker and chess player.

Political topics were also discussed, with Augusta using the meetings to gather information. In addition, she read several newspapers every day and, on this basis, created written summaries of the most important events for William. Through the meetings and exchanges with his wife, William thought (as he himself told her in a letter) that he could provide an official guideline for her statements. His aim was to influence their opinions in his favor and to conceal any disharmony between them from the public. William had Augusta take care of some of his writing correspondence: she had to proofread or copy texts he had written and was also a co-author of some of his correspondence. Such a division of tasks among royal couples was not unusual in the 19th century, because the dynasty was considered a kind of "family business".

=== Wife of the heir to the throne (1840–1858) ===
==== Increased interest in politics ====
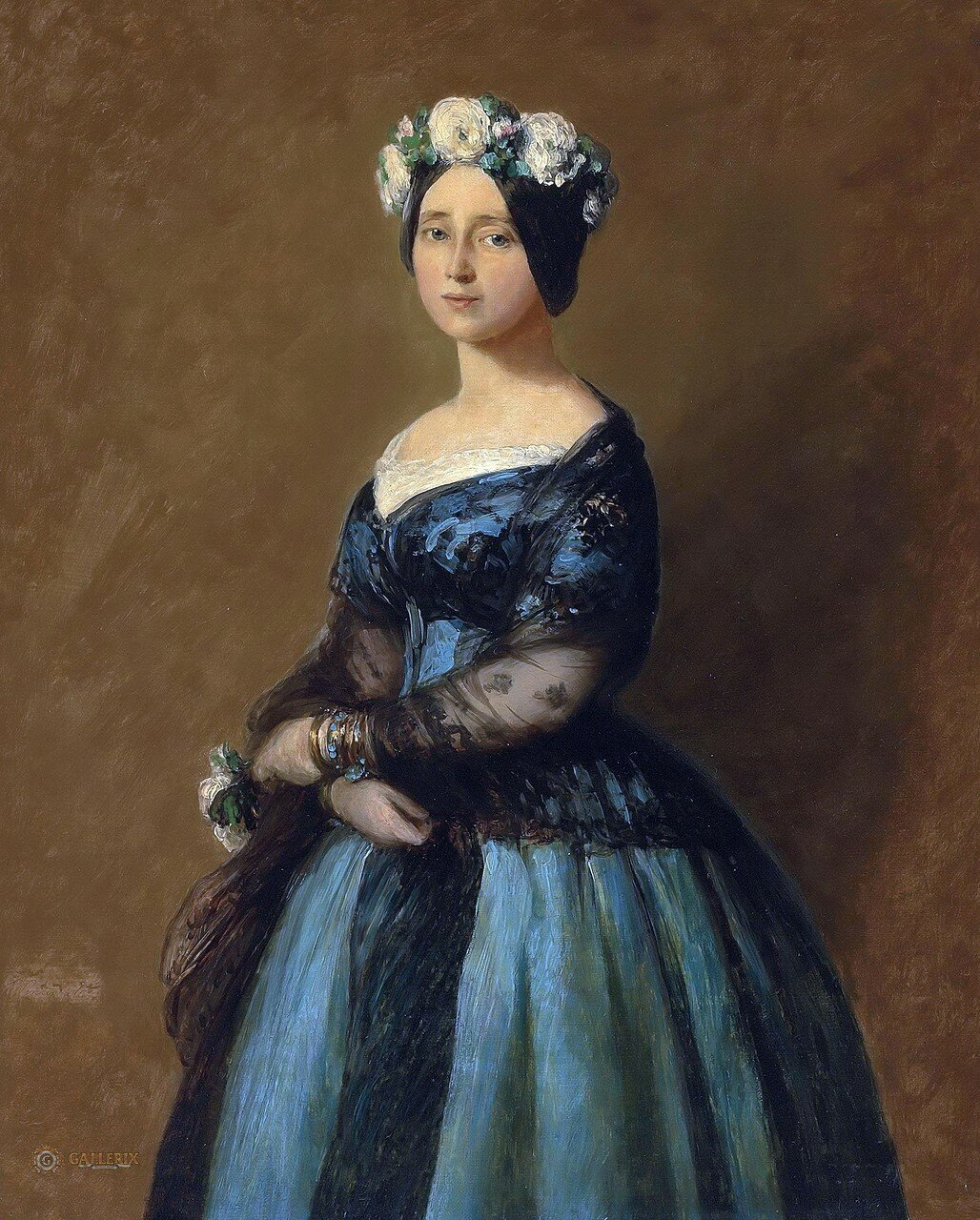
Crown Princess Augusta, by Franz Xaver Winterhalter, 1846.

With the death of King Frederick William III on 7 June 1840, William became heir to the throne. Augusta was critical of the policies of the new ruling Prussian king, her brother-in-law Frederick William IV. She viewed its lack of reform as a mistake that would cost the monarchy the loyalty of the population. Augusta advocated early "voluntary surrender" and the fulfillment of the "general wishes" of the subjects. In their opinion, the existence of the monarchical form of rule itself was at risk if the crown did not respond to the demands of the political public. She shared the assessment with the British Queen's husband, Prince Albert of Saxe-Coburg and Gotha, that Prussia should first become a constitutional state following the British model and only then should it implement national unity for Germany.

According to the historian Caroline Galm, Augusta saw it as her duty to give her son Frederick William a chance at the throne through his own political involvement. She therefore increasingly turned to political topics and from 1843 onwards wrote several memoranda, which she presented to both her husband and Prussian statesmen. For her advice, Augusta contacted, among others, the envoys Alexander von Schleinitz and Franz von Roggenbach, a politician from the Grand Duchy of Baden. The correspondence between Roggenbach and Augusta has only been partially preserved, as Augusta had politically explosive letters destroyed or returned by confidants for fear of censorship. At court, the manner in which their opinions were presented was perceived as overly temperamental. William therefore jokingly referred to his wife as a "little opposition devil" in letters. Internally, she expressed doubts about William's intellectual abilities and accused him of not being sufficiently sophisticated in his observations.

==== Contacts with the British royal family and Prince von Pückler ====
Augusta now also maintained contacts with the British Queen Victoria. In 1845 the monarch visited Augusta and William in Berlin. The following year, the princely couple made a return visit to London. Victoria showed sympathy for Augusta and said in a letter to the Belgian king:

She is too enlightened and too liberal not to have enemies at the Prussian court, but I believe that I have found in her a friend who can be very useful to us.

The correspondence between the British Queen and Augusta continued for several decades and ultimately initiated the marriage between her son Frederick William and Victoria's eldest daughter and namesake, the Princess Royal. Since the 1840s, Augusta also wrote letters to Prince Hermann von Pückler-Muskau, a famous writer and world traveler at the time. Augusta had known him from the Weimar court since 1826. She particularly appreciated the conversation with Pückler, who, in her opinion, stood out from the Prussian court with his eloquent and intellectual manner. She talked to him about, among other things, the Weimar court, England, Paris and her health. In 1842–1843 she entrusted the prince with the landscaping of Babelsberg Park. Augusta and Pückler agreed in their preference for the English cottage style and were based on English pattern books, for example by the architect Robert Lugar. In order to emphasize his artistic proximity to Augusta, Pückler had a blacksmith's shop built in Branitzer Park, which was similar to the Small Castle in Babelsberg Park.

==== Revolution of 1848: Political appeals for reform and beginning of hostility with Bismarck ====
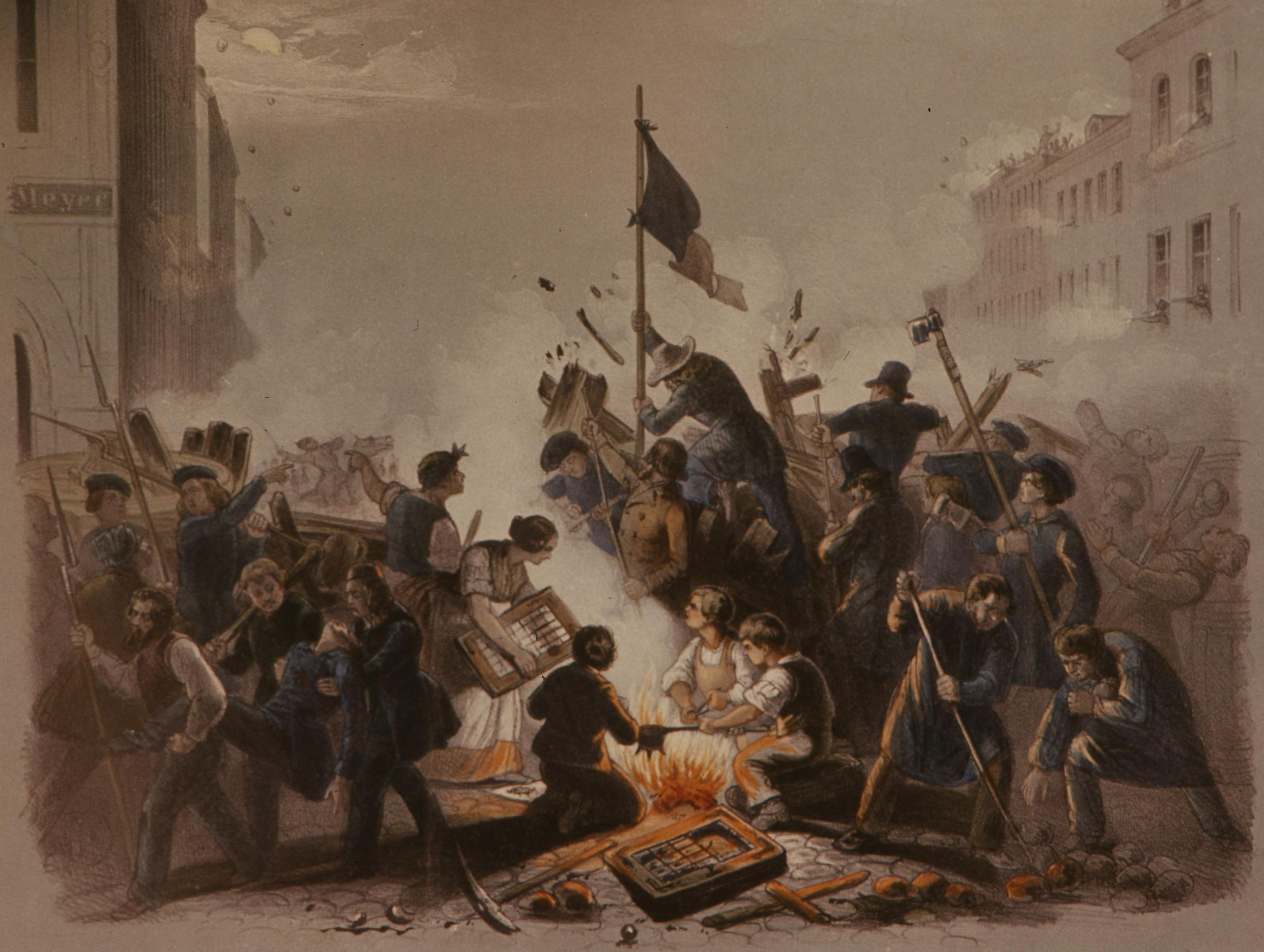
Barricade at the Friedrichstrasse during the March Revolution 1848 in Berlin, by FG Nordmann, 1848. Historical Museum, Frankfurt.

During the Revolutions of 1848–1849 there were also violent clashes between the military and the civilian population in Berlin. Augusta's husband was seen as primarily responsible for the bloodshed and was forced into exile in Great Britain. Meanwhile, Augusta took her two children to safety in Potsdam. Since she was considered comparatively enlightened by the public, she remained safe there. In response to the revolution, Augusta called for rapid reforms. In a letter to William dated 5 June 1848, she said: "It is now a matter of saving the monarchy and its support, the dynasty, this is the task for which no sacrifice can be big enough". She also recommended that Prussia, in the German question, take the initiative and push forward a national agreement regardless of the politics in Vienna and St. Petersburg. She again advised that the Prussian people should have a say in political decisions. A constitution could create a legal and clearly regulated basis for this.

The revolution of 1848–1849 had long-term consequences for Augusta's relationship with the future Chancellor Otto von Bismarck: on 23 March 1848, shortly after the March Revolution of 1848, she received him in the Potsdam City Palace. According to Augusta's version, Bismarck tried to win her over to a counter-revolution against King Frederick William IV. Bismarck wanted to find out where her husband was so that he could ask him to give him orders to march on Berlin. That would have treasonously counteracted the retreat of the soldiers ordered by King Frederick William IV. She was also bothered by the fact that Bismarck stated that he was acting on behalf of her brother-in-law Prince Charles, William's younger brother. Just a few days earlier, Charles had suggested that the King and Prince William abdicate or forego the royal succession. Augusta therefore suspected him of wanting to take the royal throne himself and stage a coup with Bismarck's help. Bismarck, for his part, subsequently accused Augusta of having plotted against William in 1848: she had worked towards taking over the regency for her son Frederick William herself. For him, it was only about protecting the reigning king from the revolution with the help of the military. Since, according to the historian and Bismarck biographer Eberhard Kolb, Augusta's and Bismarck's notes about the events contradict each other, the contents of the conversation can no longer be reconstructed. All that can be said with certainty is that Augusta had been hostile to Bismarck since this encounter.

The historian David E. Barclay estimates her role to the effect that "she successfully defended William's position as heir to the throne in the spring and summer". William's relationship with his wife improved as a result. According to Barclay's account, he also approached her politically —influenced by Augusta's memoranda and letters. The prince, who had previously been absolutist-minded, "slowly moved in a moderate-conservative but constitutional direction". However, this view is controversial. According to historian Jan Markert, William independently recognized during the 1848 revolution that the Prussian monarchy would have to come to terms with a constitutional form of government. Wehler, Hans-Ulrich, on the other hand, sees Augusta as the reason for William's later turn to the right-wing liberal Wochenblattpartei.

At the same time, the possibility of forcing a change of ruler was being considered in liberal circles. Augusta was brought into discussion as a possible regent for her underage son Frederick William. In contrast to Great Britain, Portugal and Spain, there was no tradition of reigning queens or regents in Prussia. Since King Frederick William IV also promised reforms, the plan was quickly rejected. Augusta subsequently destroyed some of her letters from the revolutionary years.

==== Koblenz years (1850–1858) ====
===== Courtyard of the Wochenblattpartei, the Rheinanlagen, charity =====
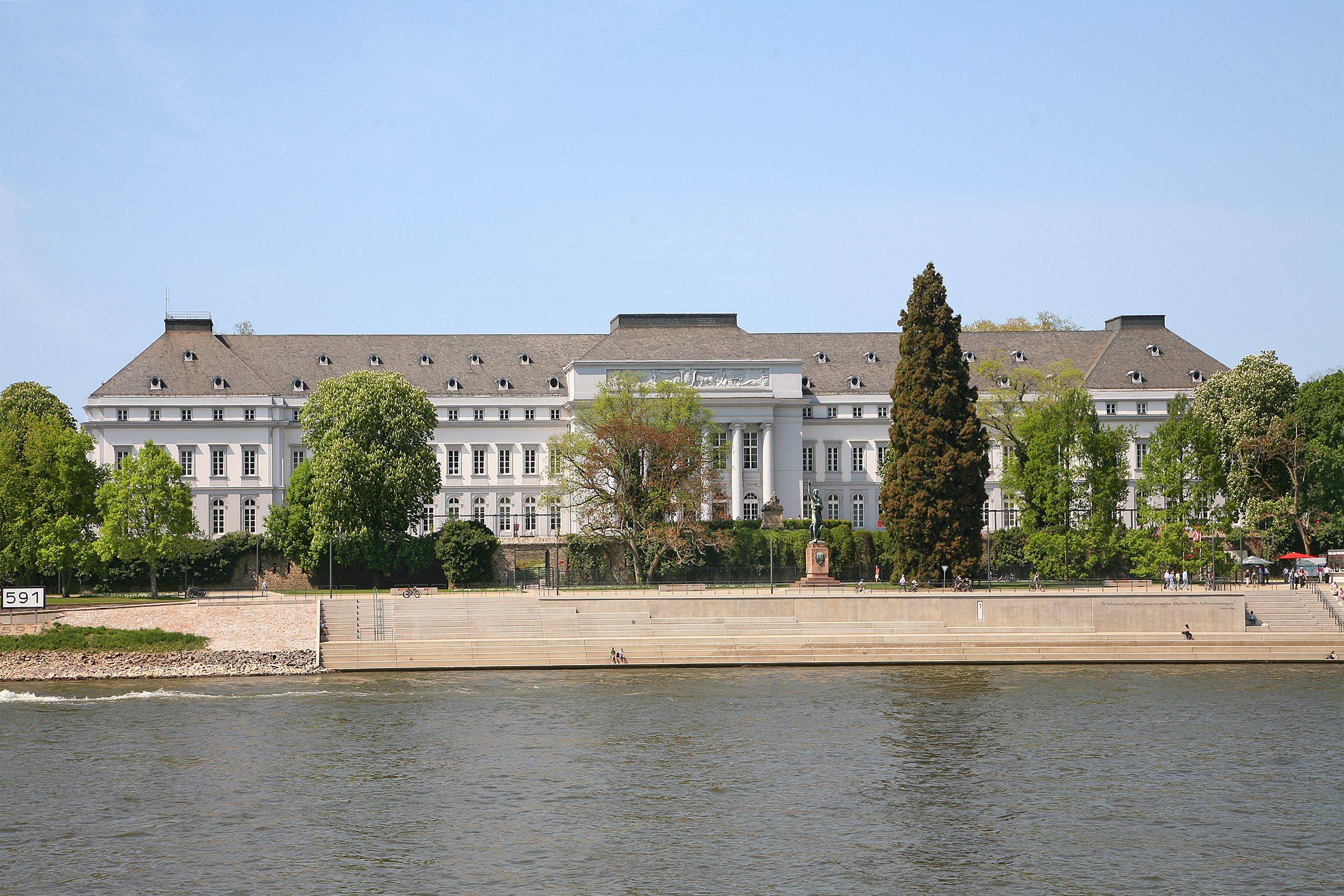
Augusta's residence in Koblenz, the former Electoral Palace.

In 1849, King Frederick William IV appointed Prince William military governor of the Rhine Province and the Province of Westphalia. From 1850 onwards, the prince moved to Koblenz, the capital of the Prussian Rhine Province. In the Electoral Palace there, Augusta had the opportunity to live a court life like she was accustomed to during her childhood at the Weimar court. In Koblenz she was able to surround herself with a group of people she liked, establish contacts with the Rhineland bourgeoisie and maintain a less distant relationship with the local population. Their tolerance towards the Catholic denomination and charitable support contributed to this. Barclay characterizes her production as both "royal-dynastic" and "close to the people". Some of Augusta's confidants at the Koblenz court, often members of the Wochenblattpartei, became ministers of state under Prince Regent William in the so-called New Era. The reigning monarch and partly also Prince William disliked Augusta's comparatively liberal choice of guests. William did not always have influence on this, as he was often not in Koblenz Castle.

In Koblenz, Augusta had a park with a promenade created on the left bank of the Rhine from 1856 onwards, the so-called Rheinanlagen. Until then, there had only been a representative section of the bank directly at the Electoral Palace and on the Rheinlache. In addition, she had the Rheinanlagen upgraded with pavilions and newly planted trees. For the first time, Augusta supported organizations on a larger scale that worked in the area of nursing or caring for the poor. These included, among others, the Catholic order of the Brothers of Mercy in Weitersburg and the Kaiserswerther Diakonie. In 1850 she became patron of the Evangelical Women's Association (Evangelischen Frauenvereins), and two years later also of the Catholic Women's Association (Katholischen Frauenvereins).

===== Marriage of children =====
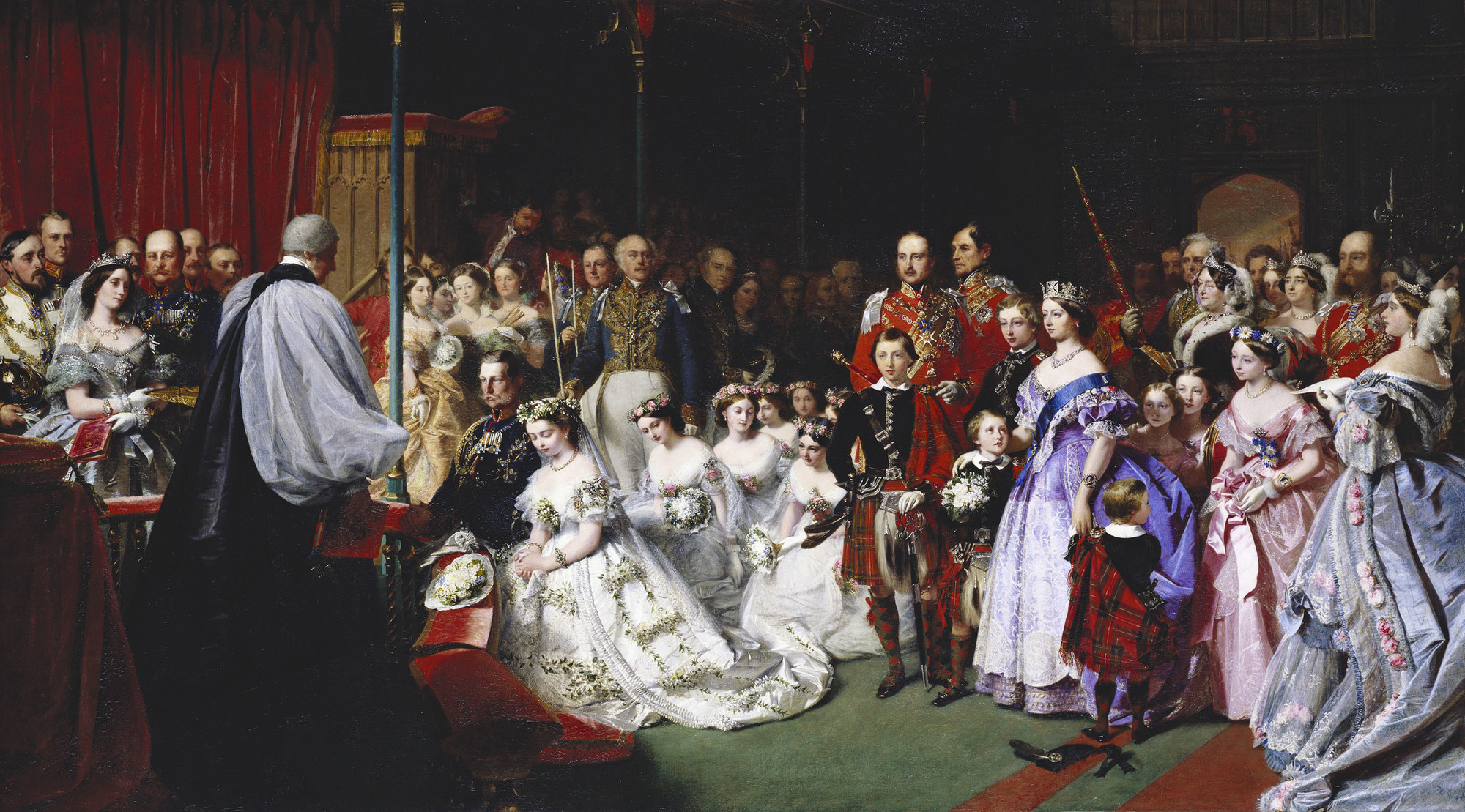
The wedding of Augusta's son Frederick William and Victoria, Princess Royal, in London's St James's Palace on 25 January 1858. The Marriage of Victoria, Princess Royal by John Phillip, 1860. Royal Collection. Augusta is the third person from the left.

Augusta initiated the marriage of her daughter Louise to Frederick I, Grand Duke of Baden, who was considered liberal, which took place in 1856. Two years later, she welcomed the marriage of her son Frederick William to Victoria, the eldest daughter of the British Queen. Augusta herself had promoted the marriage and saw it as a means of leading Prussia away from what she saw as an autocratically ruled Russia in terms of alliance policy. Instead, it should move closer to Great Britain and France.

Historian Hannah Pakula also attributes her reservations about Russia to the fact that Augusta blamed the "Russians" for the assassination of her grandfather Emperor Paul I in 1801. On the other hand, she sympathized with France throughout her life, as she was particularly familiar with its culture during her upbringing. Despite her sympathies for the British royal family, Augusta's relationship with her daughter-in-law Victoria remained quite cool. Victoria herself complained about Augusta's temperamental moodiness. Although both women shared a similar political stance, they argued about the proper upbringing of Frederick William's children. While Augusta valued traditional courtly representation, Victoria led a more middle-class family life. To Augusta's displeasure, Victoria also acted publicly and, for example, advocated university education for women. She was close to the women's movement of her time. According to Monika Wienfort, Augusta's charitable support always remained in the area of "traditional monarchical charity". Augusta's commitment was intended to increase the social standing of her class. Like many women from the aristocracy and bourgeoisie at the end of the 19th century, she did not intend to achieve emancipatory equality with men.

=== Wife of the Prince Regent (1858–1861): political influence and failure ===
Because Frederick William IV was no longer considered fit to govern after several strokes, his brother was appointed Prince Regent in 1858. In the fall of that year, Augusta returned with him to Berlin, but remained connected to Koblenz through frequent travel throughout her life. William appointed ministers who stood for a more liberal policy and many of whom had frequented the Koblenz court. Alexander von Schleinitz, a confidant of Augusta, was given the Foreign Ministry. Augusta had been close friends with Schleinitz since the revolutionary period in 1848. Bismarck therefore speculated that his rival "only owes his career to petticoats". However, the historian Bastian Peiffer sees this as an insinuation and denies that Augusta was the actual founder of the new government. Birgit Aschmann sees contemporary names such as "Augusta Ministry" as conservative attempts to devalue the new political course. Augusta therefore sympathized with the newly formed ministry. Some of the ministers, like her, were convinced that aligning with Great Britain would also be advantageous domestically. According to the American historian Otto Pflanze, she saw the government of the so-called New Era as "her ministry"; their dismissal was therefore a lasting insult for Augusta, which is why she opposed the later Prussian Prime Minister Otto von Bismarck, regardless of whether he took a liberal or conservative course in politics.

The comparatively liberal phase only lasted about three years. There were several reasons for this. On the one hand, the British Prince Consort Albert of Saxe-Coburg and Gotha, the most important operator of the Prussian-British connection, died in 1861. At the same time, conflicts between Augusta and her daughter-in-law Victoria increased. Augusta resented her influence on Frederick William. On the other hand, in the course of a reform of the Prussian army, William came into a fundamental conflict with the Prussian House of Representatives. In view of a Prussian constitutional conflict, he thought about more conservative appointments in his government.

=== Queen of Prussia (1861–1888) ===
==== Coronation and opposition to Bismarck ====
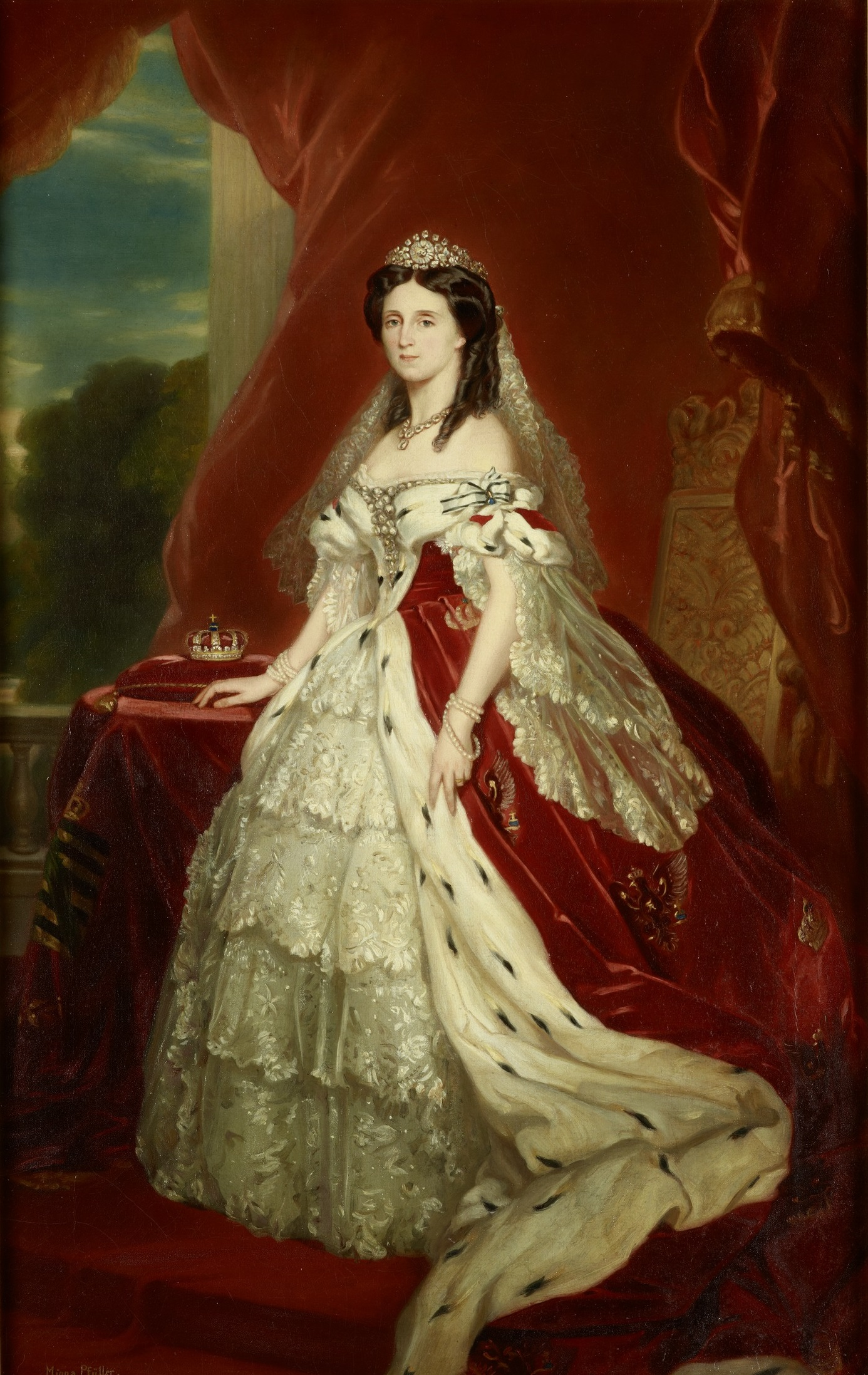
Augusta in her coronation robes and regalia, depicted by Minna Pfüller based on a painting by Franz Xaver Winterhalter, ca. 1864. Prussian Palaces and Gardens Foundation Berlin-Brandenburg.

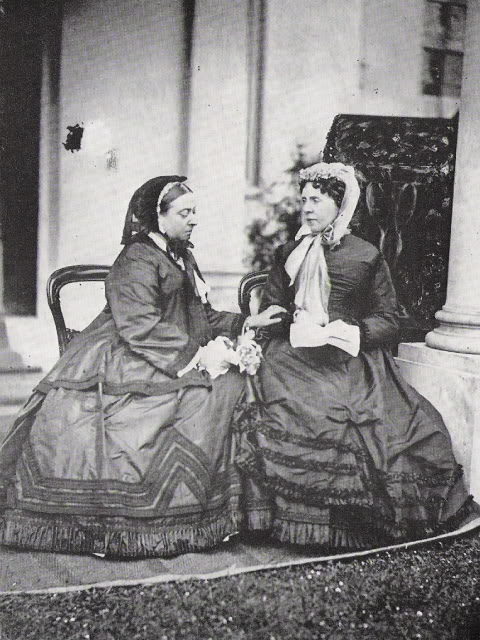
Queen Victoria with the Queen of Prussia in the gardens of Frogmore House, circa 1867.

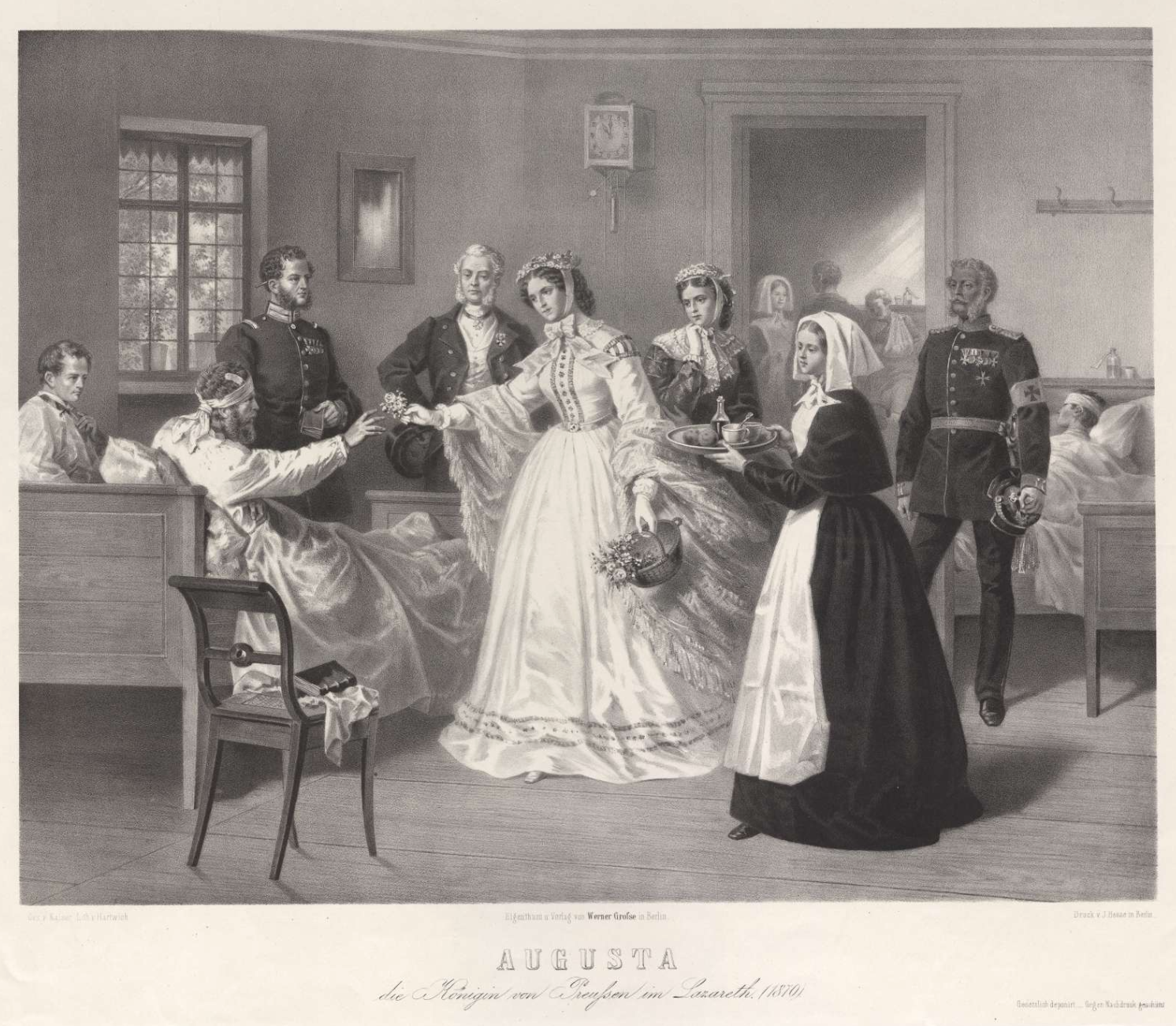
Idealizing representation of a visit by Augusta to a lazaretto, single-sheet print with the title "Augusta, the Queen of Prussia in the Lazareth, 1870", according to the signature by an illustrator with the surname Kaiser, collection of the Berlin State Library.

In the middle of this state crisis, Frederick William IV died on 2 January 1861. Augusta became Queen consort of Prussia. Her coronation ceremony took place on 18 October of the same year in the Königsberg Palace Chapel. After William had placed the royal crown on himself, he then crowned his wife. Augusta was the second crowned queen in Prussian history; before her, only Sophia Charlotte of Hanover was granted such ceremony in Königsberg in 1701. During the escalating conflict between her husband and the House of Representatives, Augusta and William tried to talk out of appointing Otto von Bismarck as Prime Minister. She did not believe that he would have an integrating and conciliatory effect and expected him to further escalate the domestic political dispute. As she found in 1864, Bismarck was a "principled and careless person [...] who sometimes had to harbor doubts about the sanity of his words and deeds". Augusta already found Bismarck's appearance as envoy to the Frankfurt Bundestag to be diplomatically unacceptable. With his undisguised great power ambitions, he always aroused mistrust among the Prussians towards friendly governments in the German Confederation. As late as Easter 1862, the queen warned her husband about Bismarck as a possible prime minister with an eighteen-page memorandum. William ignored her advice in September 1862. Crown Prince Frederick William commented on his decision with the words: "Poor Mama, how bitterly this [sic] appointment of her mortal enemy will hurt her".

Bismarck, in turn, despised Augusta because of her influence on Wilhelm. He saw her actions as a violation of the boundaries of female freedom of action. From his perspective, female influence on the supposedly weak ruler had to be avoided. In addition to Augusta, he saw Crown Princess Victoria as a threat. While Bismarck attested to Augusta's sense of duty and noble behavior, he completely denied Victoria such qualities. From the perspective of Bismarck and his allies, Augusta belonged to an opposing political camp at court. The Bismarck party therefore also publicly polemicized against Augusta as the most prominent representative of the so-called English faction. In this way, their criticism of the government's reactionary and foreign policy course should be discredited. Despite Bismarck's appointment, Augusta continued to try to advise her husband. To this end, she intensified her contact with Franz von Roggenbach and often visited the former Baden Foreign Minister in Baden-Baden, where she stayed for a cure. Like Augusta, Roggenbach was a critic of Bismarck's politics. In consultation with Roggenbach, she formulated political memoranda to William I. Bismarck held Augusta responsible if the king did not follow his advice. In such cases she had plotted against him at previous breakfasts with the king. According to Bismarck, his political opponents would form in Augusta's environment, including Crown Princess Victoria and the entire court faction that was hostile to him. In later years, Bismarck accused the queen of ruining his ability to hold office and his health with her intrigues.

==== Distanced attitude to militarism and the German war ====
Augusta did support a national unification of Germany under Prussian rule. However, the Queen wanted to see unity achieved through peaceful means and condemned the three German wars of unification in 1864, 1866 and 1870–1871. Karin Feuerstein-Praßer therefore characterizes Augusta as a pacifist. Birgit Aschmann puts this assessment into perspective by referring to Queen Augusta's 4th Guard Grenadier Regiment, which was subordinate to her and which the monarch particularly supported. Nevertheless, Aschmann emphasizes that, unlike most liberal actors, Augusta did not show any patriotic enthusiasm even during the military victories. She maintained her critical attitude towards Bismarck's foreign policy. Especially in the run-up to the Austro-Prussian War in 1866, she tried to use her correspondence to the various courts to mediate diplomatically and to avert military escalation. Augusta particularly feared an unfavorable course of the war against Austria. She argued that Prussia would benefit from the goodwill of Napoleon III in a military confrontation. The Queen also turned to the British Queen Victoria with a request for mediation. From May 1866 onwards she gave up her diplomatic appeals. In the run-up to the war of 1866, Augusta Wilhelm again tried to convince Bismarck to be fired. Victoria, Frederick William and the Grand Duke of Baden, Frederick I, also advised the Prussian monarch to take such a step. However, William stuck by his Prime Minister.

==== Charitable activity ====
Charitable welfare was considered a traditional area of activity for princesses in the 19th century. As a reaction to the wars of German unification, Augusta was primarily involved in soldier welfare. To improve the care of the wounded in the hospitals, the Queen visited the famous British nurse Florence Nightingale and received Henry Dunant, who had founded the Red Cross in 1863–64. At her instigation, the first international meeting of the Red Cross took place in Berlin in 1869. Many pictures show her with the organization's badge. Several hospitals were founded on her initiative; this includes the Langenbeck-Virchow-Haus, which still exists today and is the headquarters of the German Society of Surgery. After the death of the surgeon Bernhard von Langenbeck, Augusta lobbied the government and with its own financial subsidies to set up this society its own place of work.

Augusta also took part in the organization of the Order of Louise, which was newly founded in 1865. The award was given primarily to women who had excelled in caring for the wounded or raising funds for the affected soldiers. Augusta was able to ensure that Catholic women were also honored. She herself suggested many of those to be honored to the king. In 1866 she founded the Vaterländischer Frauenverein, which looked after wounded and sick soldiers. In 1868, Augusta used the association to organize a market in Berlin. The proceeds of 70,000 thalers then went to those affected by floods in East Prussia. Augusta himself donated 6,000 thalers to clergy in the disaster region.

==== Conduct in the Franco-Prussian War ====
In view of increasing diplomatic tensions between Prussia and France, the queen recommended that her husband adopt a conciliatory tone in 1868. In a speech he should "testify that Prussia is aware of the task of maintaining peace!". In 1870 she recommended that he not support Prince Leopold of Hohenzollern-Sigmaringen's candidacy for the Spanish throne, which was provoking France, and described the undertaking as an "adventurous project". However, Bismarck was able to prevail on William on this point, so Leopold accepted the candidacy. Bismarck used the French reactions to this to provoke France into declaring war on Prussia. As before the war against Austria in 1866, Augusta once again feared a Prussian defeat. William initially had a similar opinion, but in July 1870 he did not want to give the French government a promise that it would never approve a Hohenzollern's candidacy for the Spanish throne. Augusta expressed understanding for this position. She also classified the Paris demand as a defamatory challenge, but advocated accepting a diplomatic victory for France if necessary.

When the Franco-Prussian War broke out, Augusta was still in Koblenz. She was the last member of the royal family to return to the capital, which angered William. After the monarch left for his headquarters in France, Augusta took over many of his representative tasks in Berlin. She received ministers of state and received the reports from Governor General Bonin. She also performed tasks in the military sector, such as saying goodbye to troops or visiting officers who had suffered a family loss in the war. She also appeared in military hospitals and took part in meetings of several clubs for the care of the wounded. In the presence of the queen, dispatches about battles won were read out several times from the balcony of the Old Palace. In Aschmann's opinion, the queen was emotionally reserved. She simply waved a cloth from the balcony and wanted to show a certain distance from the war.

=== German Empress (1871–1888) ===
==== Absence at the founding of the German Empire ====
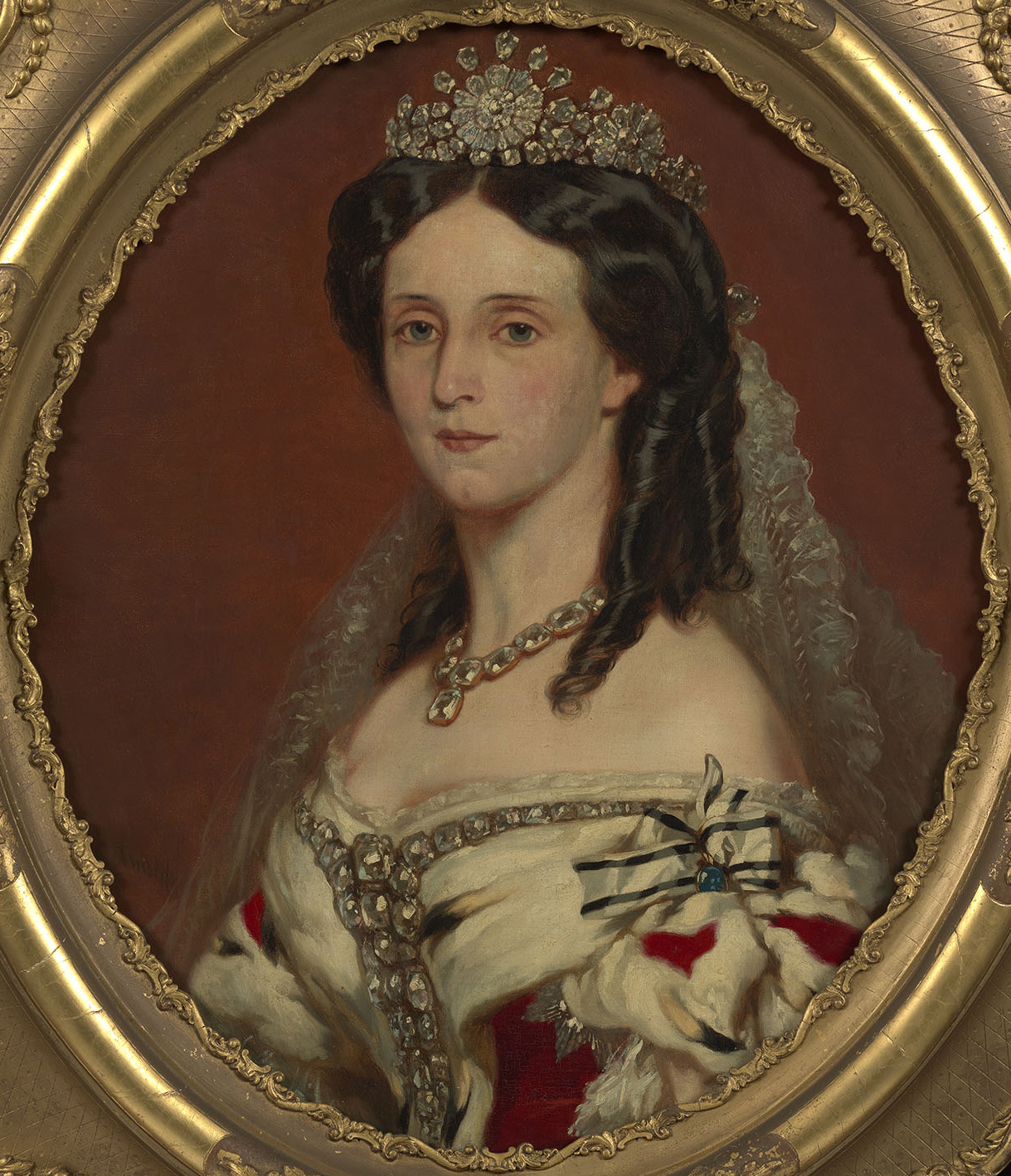
Portrait of Empress Augusta by Carl Johann Arnold, 1875, oil on canvas, Royal Collection.

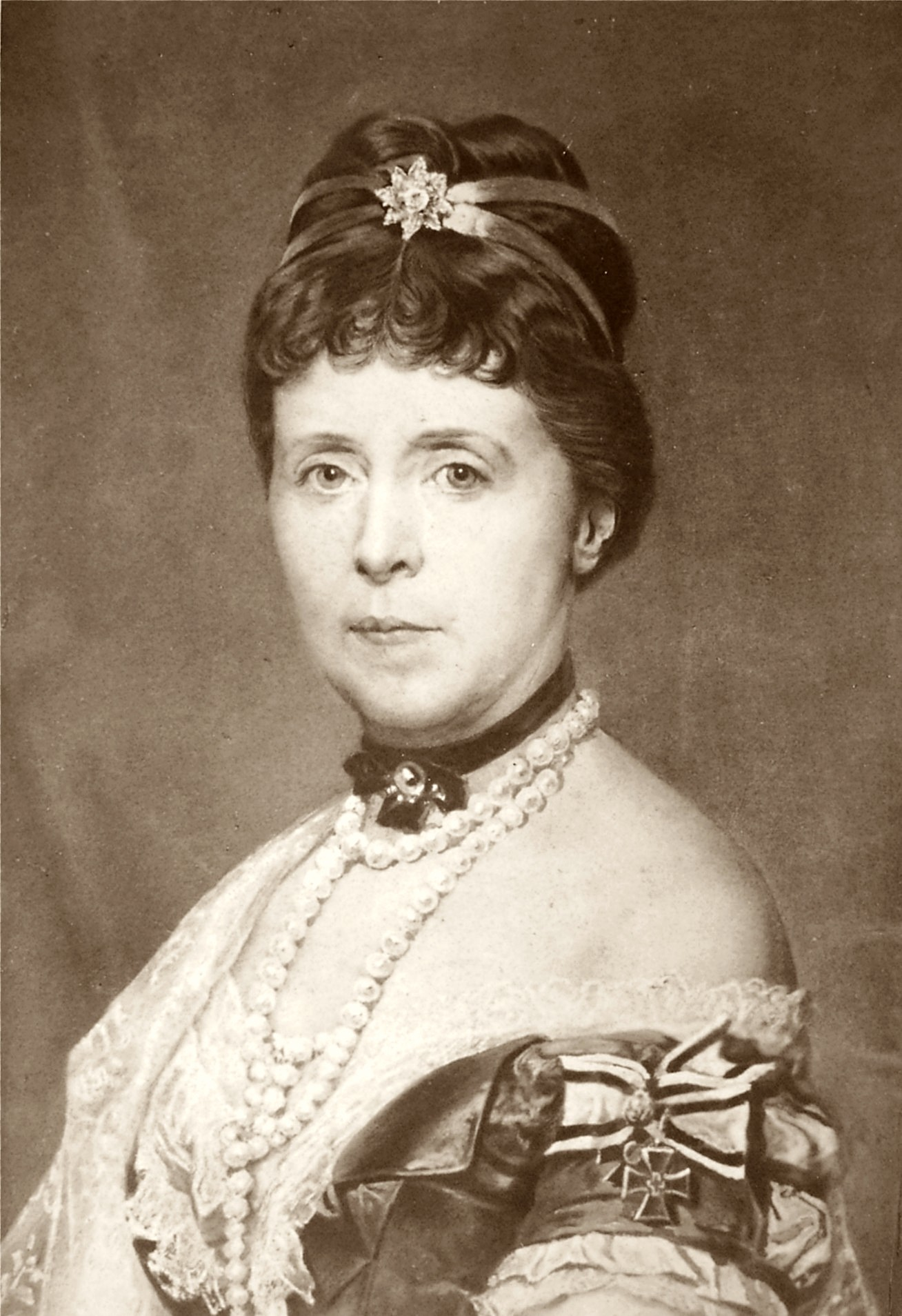
Empress Augusta, photography by F.Jamrath & Sohn Berlin, 1880s.

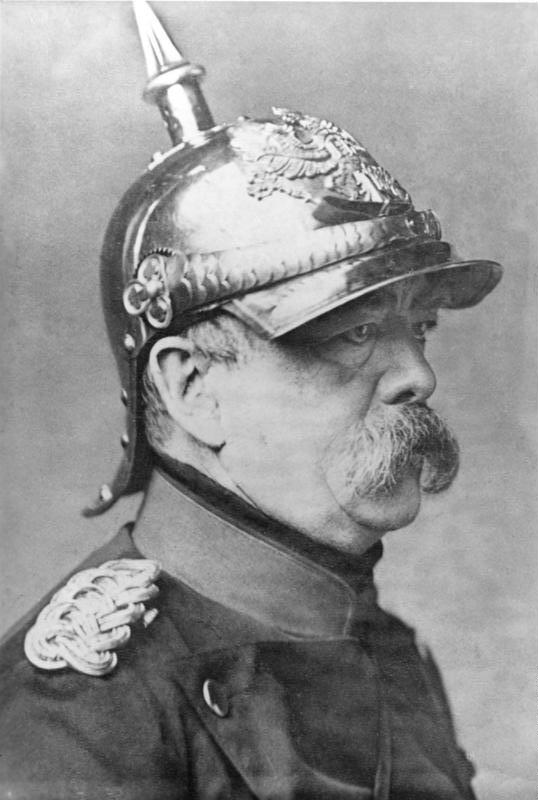
The German Chancellor Otto von Bismarck with a spiked helmet, photigraphy by Loescher, P. & Petsch, 1871, German Federal Archives.

Augusta was hardly involved in the preparations for the Proclamation of the German Empire. While William was at the Palace of Versailles near Paris, the headquarters of the General Staff, she remained in Berlin and was in close correspondence with her husband. In her correspondence she tried to influence William politically. For example, she suggested waiting to proclaim emperor until the Bavarian state parliament had agreed to join the German nation state. However, William ignored her recommendation in this regard. Since the letters from Berlin to Versailles usually took three to four days, she was hardly informed about current political issues. William did not want to resort to the quicker means of communication via telegraph to her. She did not want to use the title of German Empress herself. In December 1870, Augusta informed the Grand Duke of Saxe-Weimar-Eisenach that it was sufficient if only William took imperial rank. However, Augusta's stance on this issue was not taken into account. After William's proclamation as Emperor on 18 January 1871, she received letters —for example from the Prussian state parliament— congratulating her on her new dignity. However, the title of "German Empress" was never legally fixed in the Constitution of the German Empire.

==== Criticism of the Kulturkampf ====
The Empress's political relationship with Catholicism played a special role after 1871: Augusta, who, like the Emperor, belonged to the Protestant faith, saw Ultramontanism, a political movement loyal to the Pope, as a detriment to the loyalty of the Catholic population since the 1850s. According to the historian Caroline Galm, Augusta therefore tried to "remedy integration deficits and reconcile the Catholics with the Protestant ruling dynasty". For example, in order to gain sympathy in predominantly Catholic southern Germany, Augusta recommended that her husband diplomatically advocate for the Pope's rights in October 1870. The background to this was the occupation of the previously independent Papal States by troops of the Kingdom of Italy. The Empress considered Bismarck's anti-Catholic policy in the Kulturkampf to be the wrong approach. Although she also rejected the content of the First Vatican Council of 1869, she believed that reconciliation could be achieved with moderate Catholic forces. In 1872 she sent William a specially written memorandum "on the ecclesiastical-political situation". In the document she called on him to "have a calming effect on the Catholic Church, to restore the lost trust and to mitigate the harshness of the contradictions as much as possible". Augusta appealed to the authorities and Emperor several times on behalf of the Catholic population. In 1872, for example, she campaigned for Philipp Krementz to remain in office as Bishop of Warmia. The cultural scientist Andrea Micke-Serin attributes a softening of the Congregations Law of 1875 to Augusta's influence. Although the law continued to provide for the closure of Catholic monastic orders in Prussia, it excluded pure nursing orders from this.

==== Climax of the conflict with Bismarck ====
In 1877, Bismarck asked the Emperor to dismiss him, ostensibly because of the ongoing conflicts with Augusta and those around him. After William granted him a vacation of several weeks, Bismarck pushed several press articles in which he primarily blamed the Empress for his plans to resign. As Bismarck biographer Christoph Nonn summarizes, the Imperial Chancellor competed with several players at court for influence over the monarch. The Queen and Empress would have a special role to play here. As he himself complained, Bismarck had to constantly work against their influence on the monarch. The American historian Jonathan Steinberg explains Bismarck's enmity with psychological childhood trauma. Under a domineering and cold-hearted mother, he developed a strong contempt for women and felt threatened by women who dominated their weak husbands. Augusta, who appeared self-confident towards William, fit into Bismarck's image of the enemy. At the same time, Steinberg sees the Empress as a favorable factor for Bismarck's political position in the Empire. The conflict with Augusta made the Emperor more lenient and increased his willingness to give in to the political demands of his chancellor.

==== Approaching the Reich Chancellor ====
Since the Catholic Center Party gained votes in the Reichstag elections of 1878, Bismarck was forced to end the Kulturkampf. Augusta considered this a personal success against Bismarck. Shortly afterwards the Empress began to approach Bismarck. The reason for this was, on the one hand, their respect for his foreign policy achievements at the Congress of Berlin. Augusta now described the Imperial Chancellor as a "brilliant statesman". In Bismarck's spirit, it encouraged William to enter into a dual alliance with Austria without Russia. On the other hand, she now considered Bismarck to be the right man to prepare her grandson, the future German Emperor William II, for his government work. According to Augusta biographer Karin Feuerstein-Praßer, Augusta's approach to Bismarck had less to do with his politics than with tensions within the family. Like the Imperial Chancellor, she considered her son Frederick William to be less suitable as a future ruler than Prince William. She denied the Crown Prince the intellectual abilities and political determination required for the imperial office. Augusta and Bismarck were particularly bothered by the fact that Victoria was diminishing her own influence over Frederick William. Both therefore placed their political expectations on Prince William. Since he was not on good terms with his mother Victoria, the prince also became closer to his grandmother and his aunt Louise after his studies.

==== Annual travel and political involvement in the last years of life ====
Augusta often stayed away from the Berlin court. She only spent about half the year in Berlin. In May she usually traveled to Baden-Baden for a cure. This was followed by a stay in Koblenz in June, where she pursued charitable and social tasks. From there she occasionally visited her daughter Louise in the Baden residential city of Karlsruhe or took a spa treatment in Bad Ems, where her husband also traveled. In the fall, Augusta stayed again in Baden-Baden or on the Lake Constance island of Mainau. She spent the winter season in Berlin from November to April.

The Empress herself increasingly suffered from physical ailments (including rheumatism) for many years and sustained serious injuries in a fall in Koblenz in June 1881. From then on she was dependent on crutches and a wheelchair. Nevertheless, Augusta tried to continue to participate politically and also to fulfill her patronage of the Catholic population. To this end, she relied, among other things, on financial support.

When her husband died on 9 March 1888, Augusta was personally present in the Old Palace. Only 99 days later, on 15 June, her son, who had succeeded to the throne as Frederick III, succumbed to cancer of the larynx. As a result, her beloved grandson, William II, become King of Prussia and German Emperor.

=== Death and legacy ===
Augusta died on 7 January 1890, aged 78, at the Old Palace during the 1889–1890 flu pandemic.

She was initially lying in state for the public at the Old Palace on Unter den Linden boulevard in Mitte, the historic heart and city center of Berlin, and later buried at the Mausoleum at Charlottenburg Palace beside her husband. In accordance with her will, the Augusta Fund, other charitable institutions (particularly in Berlin and Koblenz) and the Koblenz Rheinanlagen received financial donations.

== Reception ==
=== Contemporary perception ===
==== Bismarck and its surroundings ====
Since Bismarck had not been on good terms with Augusta since the revolution of 1848, he painted a negative picture of the Empress in his autobiography, Thoughts and Memories: she had exerted a harmful influence on William I and was due to her sympathies for the French and English culture was unpatriotic. Bismarck also falsely accused her of being a "traitor" who passed on state secrets to the French embassy. Their pacifist attitude was unrealistic and their intrigues made it difficult for him to conduct state affairs. The Prussian Prime Minister and Imperial Chancellor attributed a "need for contradiction" to the Empress: when he swung to a conservative course, she tried to promote a liberal group of people. If, on the other hand, he acted more liberally, the Empress would have sided with the conservatives and Catholics. Bismarck thought that Augusta only did not oppose the Prussian government during the so-called New Era. In this phase she was able to prevail in the ministerial election. The historian Petra Wilhelmy comes to the conclusion that Bismarck for Augusta "did injustice to a certain extent". The monarch did not act out of a fundamental "spirit of contradiction" to his policies, but rather, in contrast to the Reich Chancellor, was comparatively liberal-minded and religiously tolerant. In addition to Bismarck, Ernest II, Duke of Saxe-Coburg and Gotha, publicly positioned himself against the supposed dominance of the Empress and Crown Princess Victoria, his own niece. In view of the "women's policy" he warned against "hostile and harmful to the Germans" undertakings.

==== Controversial public reputation ====
Overall, however, the effectiveness of Augusta's political actions in the 19th century was rated as low due to her conflict with Bismarck. Reviews focused on their representative role in the monarchy. Like other princesses, she had to conform to the prevailing role model, that is, to be active in the area of charitable work and royal representation, the latter particularly during William's war-related absences. From the perspective of contemporaries, Augusta was only partially suitable for this. Although she was present as the patron of many Vaterländischer Frauenverein, apart from this commitment to caring for the wounded, she mostly kept a low profile in public.

On 27 July 1867, the Illustrirte Zeitung criticized Augusta's increasing withdrawal into family life. Before the revolution of 1848–1849 she was still "a brilliant figure at the court in Berlin". Nowadays, however, she mainly keeps herself "hidden in the quiet circle of family life [...]" and hardly takes part in Berlin court life anymore. Instead, she spent "most of the year outside the residence [...], at her favorite residence in Koblenz or in Karlsruhe with her daughter, or in a German bath, where she takes the usual cure". There was also criticism that she appeared in the capital in a rather inconspicuous manner for a monarch, i.e. that she did not represent enough of her social status. According to Katrin Feuerstein-Praßer, Augusta was never popular outside of Koblenz during her lifetime. The historian attributes this to the fact that Augusta would have had difficulty maintaining intensive contacts with the Prussian elite. On the other hand, it caused a stir that she spoke and wrote predominantly in French. This was no longer common practice at the German courts during the founding of the empire. According to the historian Gerd Heinrich, Augusta was a "controversial figure in almost every respect" among her contemporaries. On the one hand, her influence on the upbringing of the heir to the throne and her daughter Louise was viewed positively. Their princely demeanor and manners were sometimes considered appropriate; On the other hand, Augusta's irritability and her mood swings were negative. The intellect attributed to her Weimar influence and her penchant for ostentation would have seemed inappropriate at the comparatively economical Hohenzollern court.

According to Georg Wagner-Kyora, Augusta's charitable efforts gave Prussia prestige on the international stage. Their diplomatic network with other royal houses made them appear unwarlike in the public eye. However, she never achieved the popularity of her granddaughter-in-law Augusta Victoria in the Empire. William II's wife was respected even among the German bourgeoisie. Augusta, on the other hand, remained too caught up in "dynastic traditionalism" according to Wagner-Kyora's assessment. According to David Barclay, by emphasizing her high aristocratic origins from the Weimar grand ducal family, she maneuvered herself into an outsider position. Hannah Pakula blames Augusta's personality for her negative image in court circles. Although Augusta was intellectual and intelligent, she "couldn't stand it when someone didn't agree with her". Her energetic appearance at court events attracted criticism. King Leopold I of Belgium for example, gave her the nickname "Dragon of the Rhine", alluding to her fondness for the Rhineland. In the Prussian Rhine Province and especially in Koblenz, Augusta's long-standing residence, the role of the Empress was viewed positively. The history didacticist Marco Zerwas attributes the "real veneration of the largely Catholic population [...] for the Protestant Hohenzollerns and William" largely to Augusta's public popularity. On the occasion of her death in 1890, the city of Koblenz issued a memorial publication entitled Kaiserin Augusta in Coblenz. 1850–1889. The work attributes a greater role to their work in the integration of the Rhineland into the Prussian state than to legislation and administration.

=== Symbolic representation and commemoration ===
==== Eponyms and monuments ====
Empress Augusta monuments

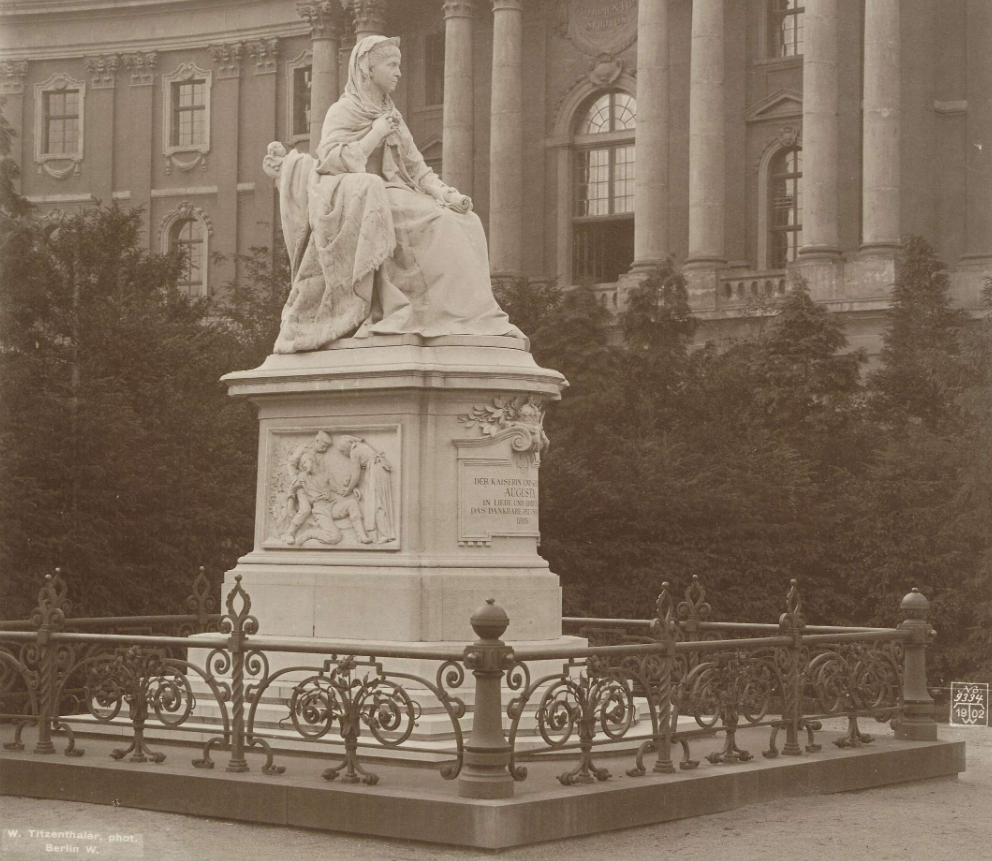
Bebelplatz in Berlin, created between 1892 and 1895 by Fritz Schaper, destroyed during World War II. Photography by Waldemar Titzenthaler, 1902.

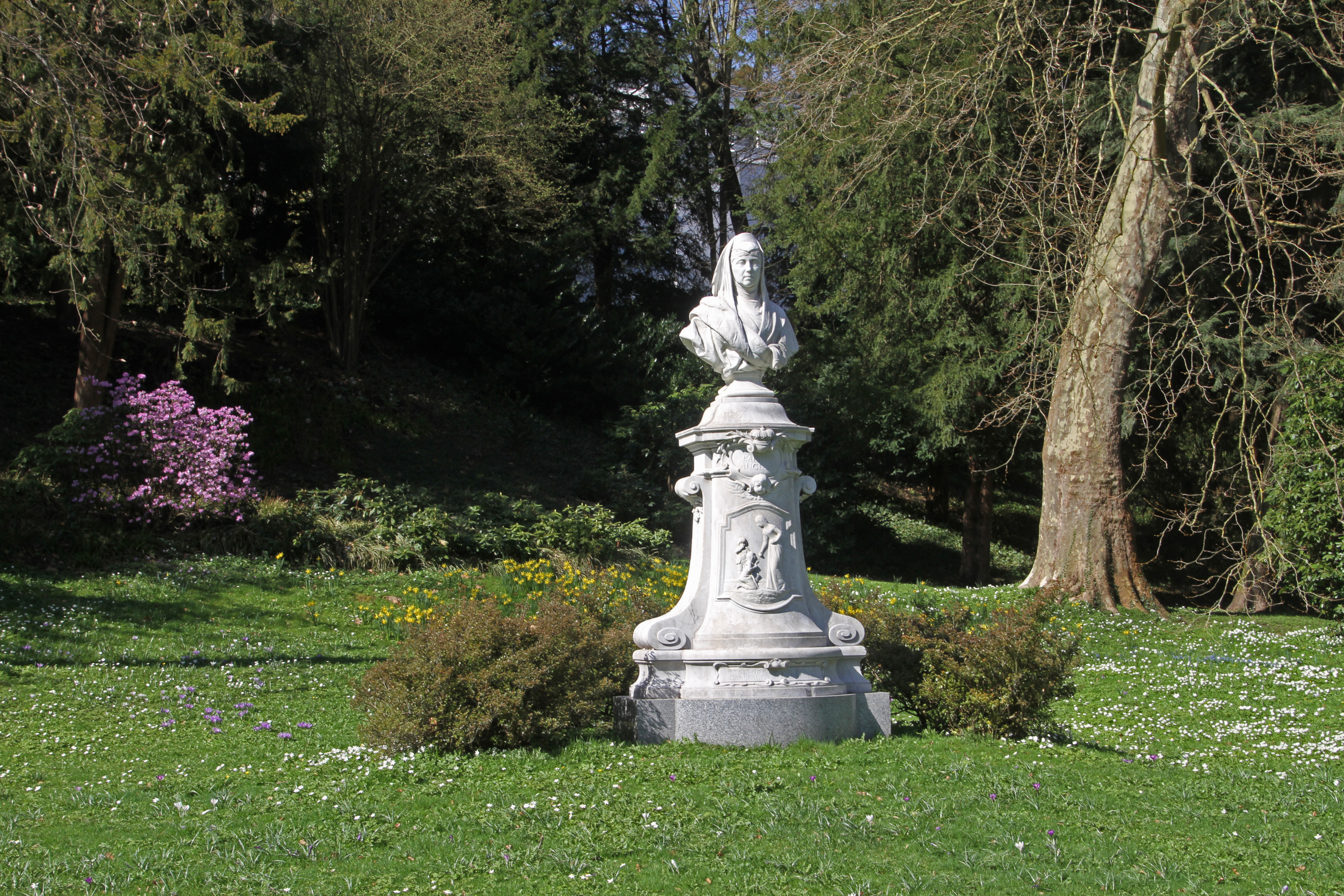
Lichtentaler Allee in Baden-Baden, work by Joseph Kopf (bust) and Friedrich von Thiersch (granite base), 1892.

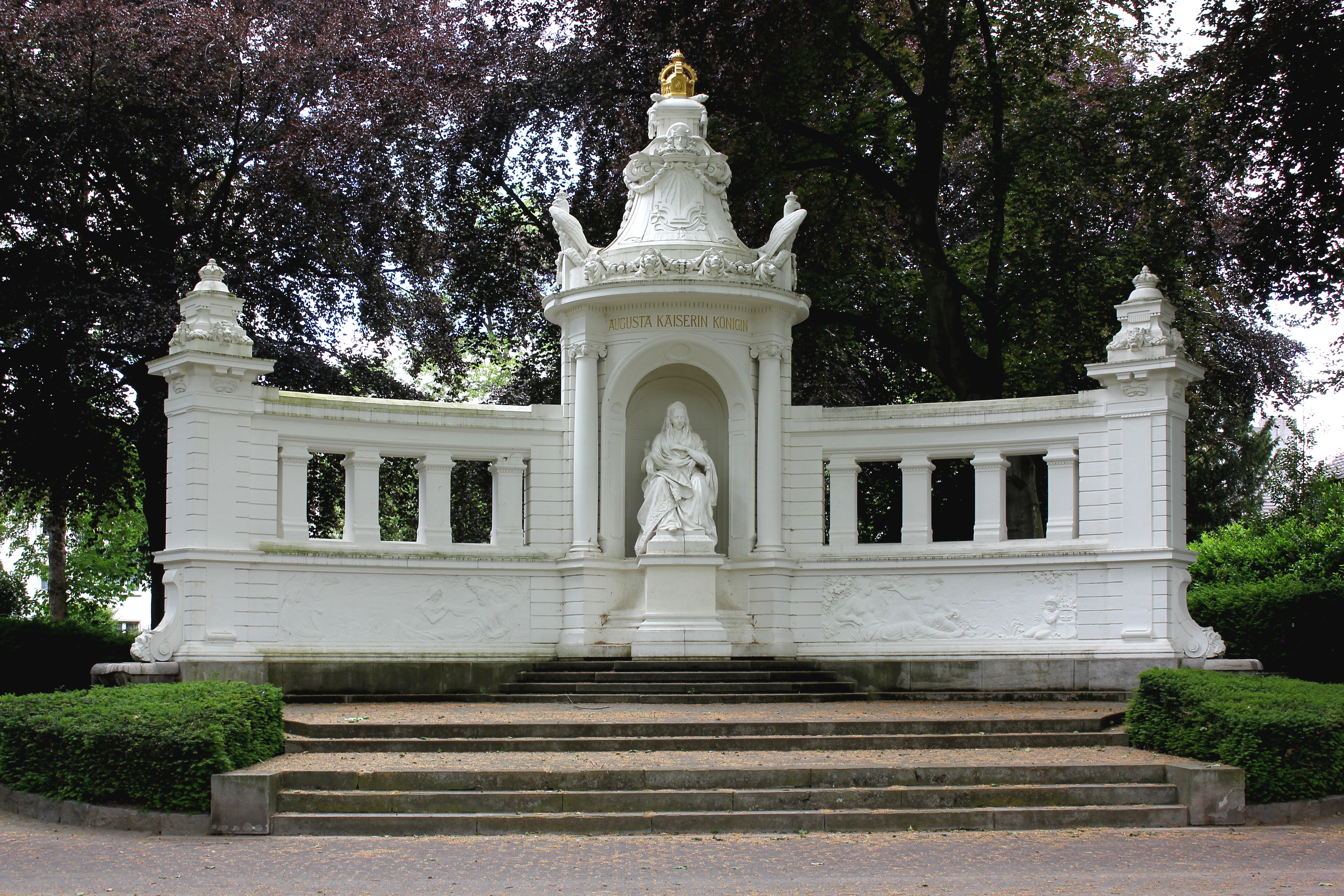
Monument in den Rheinanlagen in Koblenz, inaugurated in 1896, work by Karl Friedrich Moest (sculpture) and Bruno Schmitz (monument).

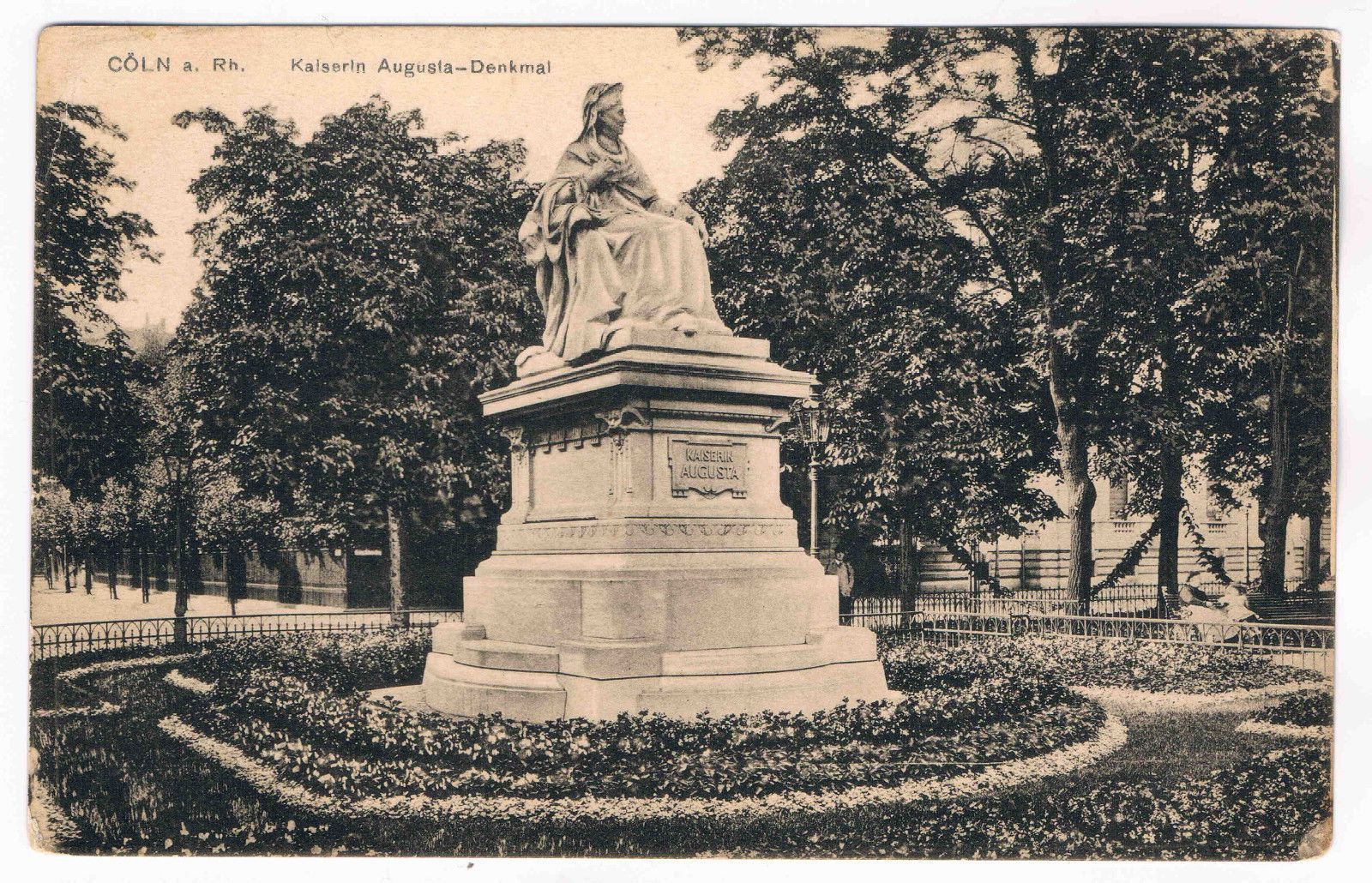
Kaiser-Wilhelm-Ring in Köln, 1903, work by Franz Dorrenbach (bust) and Heinrich Stockmann (base), destroyed in 1943.

According to the historian Alexa Geisthövel, the memory of the Empress lost significance shortly after her death. Streets, secondary schools for girls and hospitals such as the Kaiserin Augusta Hospital in Berlin were named after her. However, only "a few monuments" (Note: Among others, the following were named for her: The steam corvette SMS Augusta, built in the 1860s.; The protected cruiser SMS Kaiserin Augusta, built by the German Navy in the year of her death.; Kaiserin-Augusta-Straße in Berlin and the Berlin U-Bahn station in that street.; The Kaiserin Augusta Gymnasium, founded in 1818 and named for her in 1876.; Empress Augusta Bay on Bougainville Island) were dedicated to her. Geisthövel emphasizes that in the 19th century it was unusual to erect public monuments to a non-reigning monarch. Among the Prussian queens, Augusta was the second after Louise of Mecklenburg-Strelitz to have a monument dedicated to her in Berlin. In 1891 a "Comité" called for donations for the Empress Augusta monument. As a result, the seated figure was inaugurated in 1895 on Opernplatz, today's Bebelplatz. The historian Helke Rausch interprets the erection of the Augusta monument "in the middle of the monarchical representation area" as an "attempt at politicization": since celebrations for the 25th anniversary of the founding of the German Empire were imminent at the time, the former head of the Berlin city council, Albert Stryck, pleaded in his speech at the monument to see Augusta as a representative figure of the German Empire alongside William I, the generals and statesmen. The reason he gave was that the Empress had raised young women to be active in nursing and to look after the men wounded in the wars of German unification. According to Rausch, contemporaries made Augusta a role model for female "duty and willingness to sacrifice" in the charitable sector. The Empress's monument, which was moved to the park of Schloss Monbijou in 1928, was destroyed during World War II.

In Baden-Baden, the city council commissioned the sculptor Joseph Kopf to build a monument to Empress Augusta. The bust was inaugurated in 1893 and was intended to commemorate the Empress's regular spa stays in the city. In 1893, in their residential city of Koblenz, an architectural competition was announced for a monument, which Bruno Schmitz won. By 1896 he built the Empress Augusta Monument together with the sculptor Karl Friedrich Moest. A figure of the ruler stands in the middle of the complex. A baldachin in the monument surrounds the figure from behind. The decorations symbolically indicate Augusta's commitment to the Red Cross and the city of Koblenz. The city of Cologne had another monument to the Empress planned and built on Kaiser-Wilhelm-Ring from 1897 onwards. The contract was advertised nationwide and a cost limit of 60,000 marks was set. The choice fell on the sculptors Franz Dorrenbach and Heinrich Stockmann. They completed a marble seated figure of the Empress by 1903.

==== Pictorial representations ====
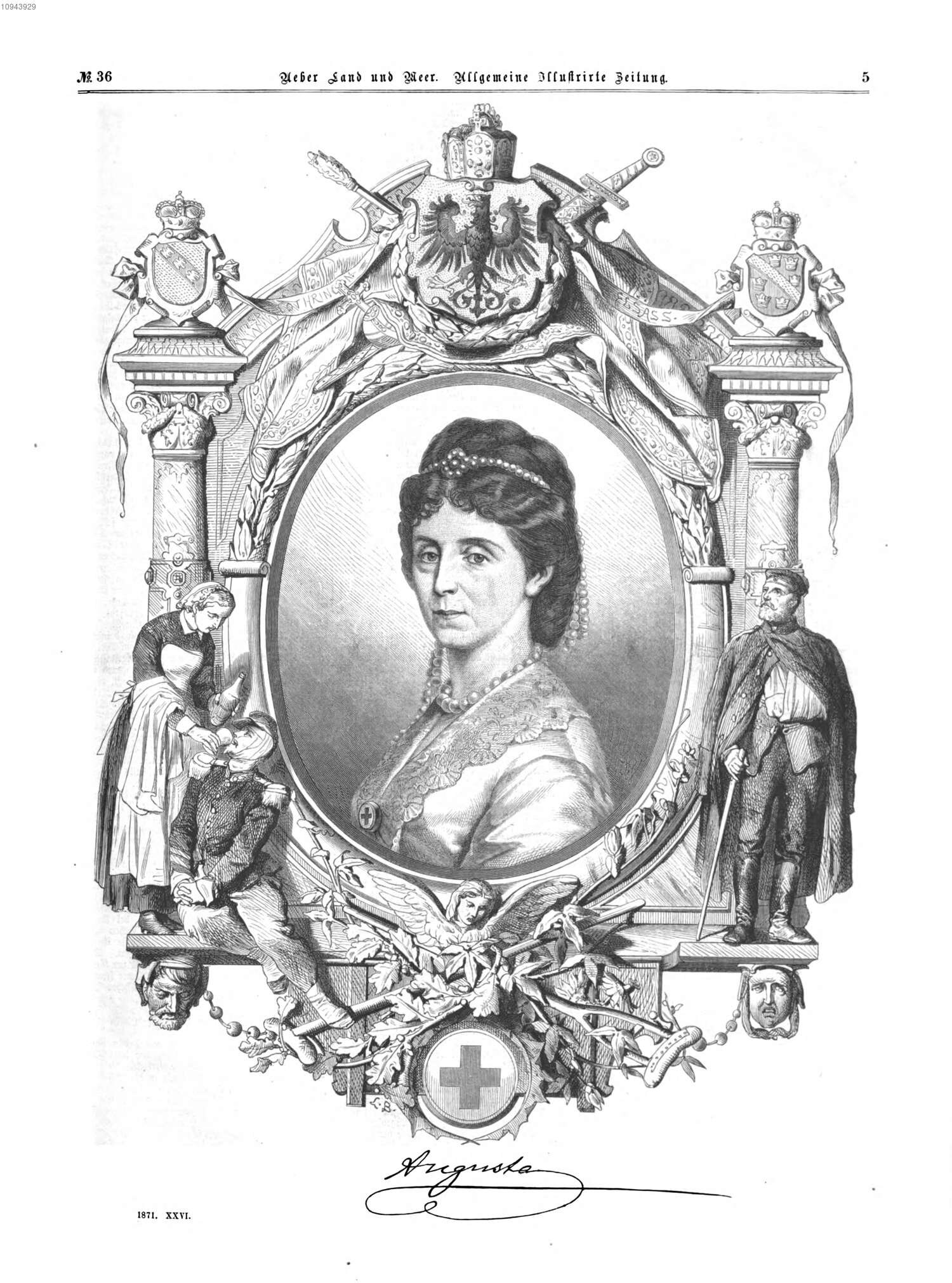
Augusta in a medallion, wood engraving from the newspaper Über Land und Meer, 1871, artist unknown, Bavarian State Library.

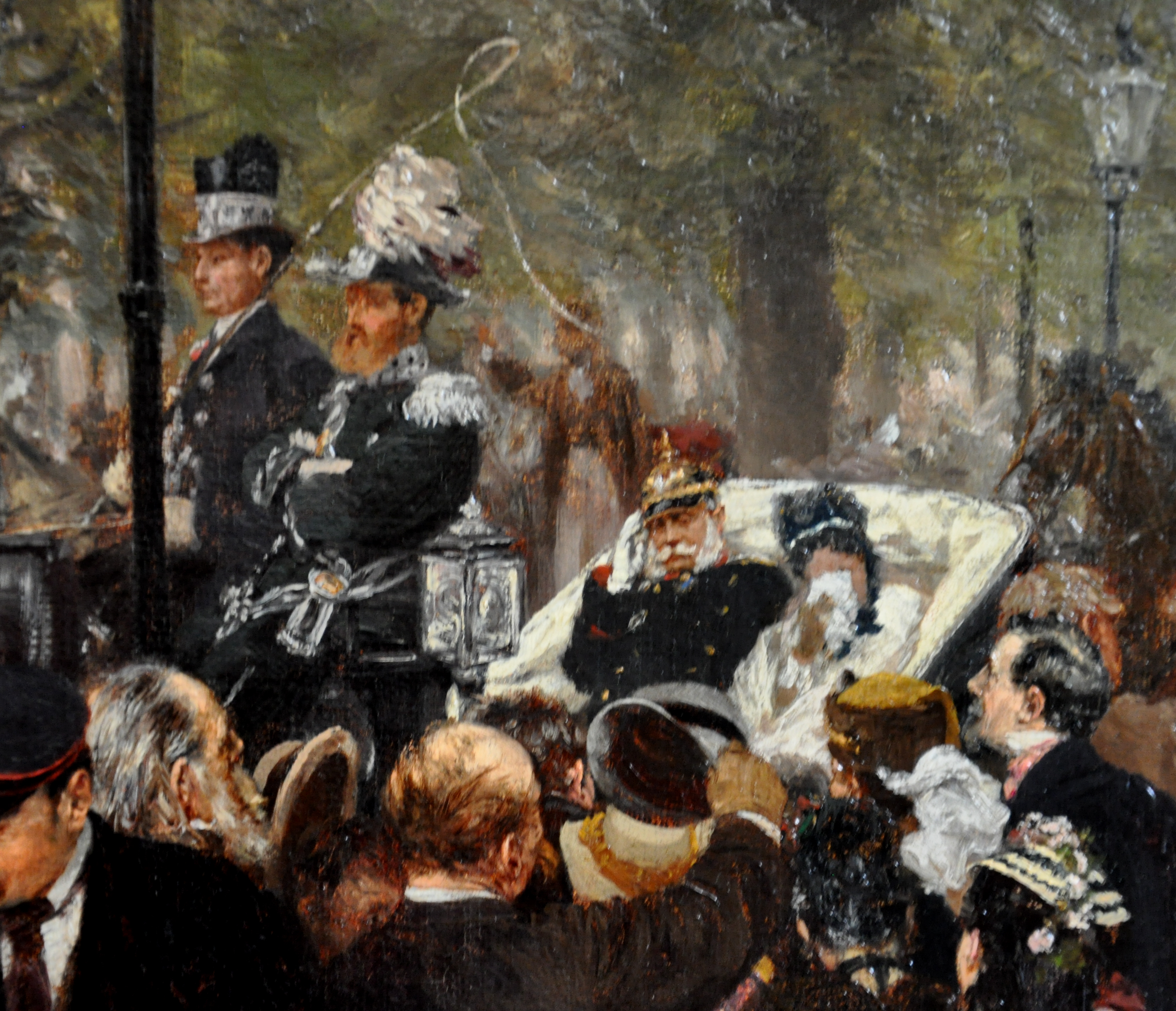
Augusta and William's carriage ride on Unter den Linden in Berlin, image detail from the painting Departure of King Wilhelm I for the Army, July 31, 1870 by Adolph Menzel, 1871, Alte Nationalgalerie, Berlin.

Augusta used visual representations as a means of propaganda. Contrary to bourgeois values, however, she usually did not allow herself to be portrayed as the wife of William I. Instead, she showed herself as an independent monarch and thus followed the traditional image of a ruler. At the same time, she distanced herself from the militarism of the time in her depictions. According to Wagner-Kyora, a wood engraving from 1871, which she had copied, is typical in this regard. The picture shows her with a Red Cross brooch in a medallion. Two injured soldiers flank them. Below the medallion you can see the symbol of the Red Cross and an angel with crutches. On the one hand, the picture highlights Augusta's support of war-wounded care. At the top, the emblems of the German Empire, Alsace and Lorraine also refer to the newly created imperial state of Alsace-Lorraine; Augusta thus appears as a triumphant. Adolph Menzel portrayed Augusta as a pacifist in his painting Departure of King Wilhelm I for the Army, July 31, 1870. As the Franco-Prussian War begins, she mournfully presses a white handkerchief into her face. She is in striking contrast to the crowd, which is largely cheering the war. Significantly, says Wagner-Kyora, Red Cross flags can be seen in the painting, which were not present in the real historical situation, but here emphasize Augusta's pacifist attitude.

==== Exhibitions and events ====
In recent years, several special exhibitions have been dedicated to the life and work of Augusta:

- The first Augusta exhibition was held in what is now the Duchess Anna Amalia Library in Weimar in 1911. The occasion was the Empress's 100th birthday. The librarian Paul von Bojanowski wrote an accompanying biography entitled "Weimar and the Empress Augusta". In the book, which is also an exhibition catalog, Bojanowski focuses primarily on the cultural impact of the Weimar court on Augusta.
- In 2011, the Klassik Stiftung Weimar presented an exhibition in the Schloss Weimar entitled "The Empress from Weimar. Augusta of Saxe-Weimar and Eisenach". The occasion for this was the Empress's 200th birthday. The main topic was the childhood and youth of the then princess, i.e. her time at the Weimar court. 34 exhibits were shown, including notes from Augusta's court tutors and drawings by the princess herself.

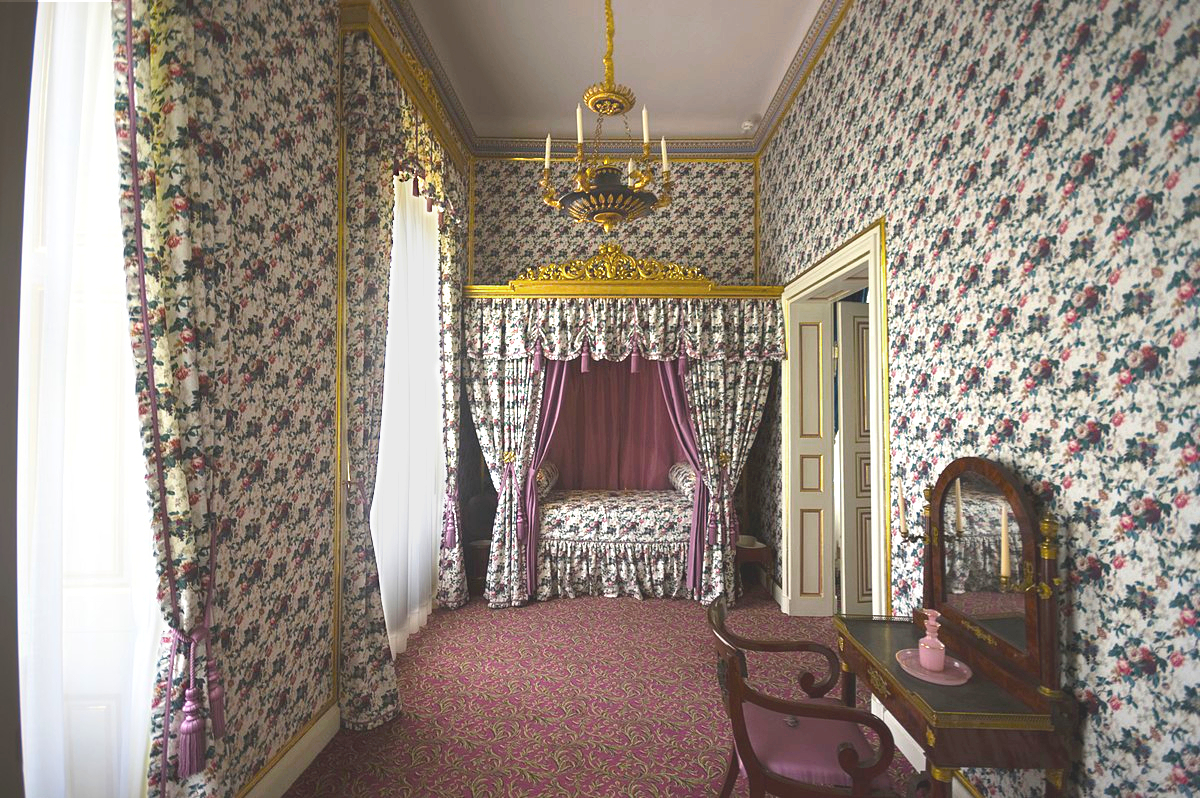
The sleeping quarters in Branitz Palace, redesigned for Augusta, intended by Prince von Pückler for the future queen since May 1857, briefly used by Augusta on 25 July 1864.

- In 2015, the Prussian Palaces and Gardens Foundation Berlin-Brandenburg showed the special exhibition "Women's Matter in Schloss Charlottenburg. How Brandenburg became Prussia". The presentation also dealt with Augusta, along with other Prussian monarchs. The Empress was portrayed as a failed liberal opponent of Chancellor Bismarck.
- In 2017 was presented in Schloss Babelsberg the exhibition "Pückler. Babelsberg. The Green Prince and the Empress". The focus of the exhibition was on Prince von Pückler's friendly relationship with Augusta. From 1842 onwards, the noble nobleman redesigned Babelsberg Park on behalf of Augusta and William.
- The special exhibition "Augusta of Prussia – the Queen as a guest in Branitz" in 2017 also focused on the relationship between the future German Empress and Prince von Pückler. The main topic was Augusta's stay at Schloss Branitz on 25 July 1864. Pückler had rooms in his castle redesigned for Augusta's only visit and ten courses served at the table.

Since 2006, the Empress Augusta Festival has taken place in the Koblenz Rheinanlagen every year on UNESCO World Heritage Day, the first Sunday in June. The event is opened by an actress dressed as Empress Augusta.

=== Research ===
Research has only focused more intensively on Augusta in the last two decades. Until then, the image of the Empress intended by Bismarck was mostly continued. Despite various publications, a generally accepted scientific biography is still missing. In particular, more source-based specialist essays are now questioning Bismarck's story regarding the Empress. The historian Monika Wienfort judged in 2018 that "Augusta research" hardly exists to date. According to the historian Birgit Aschmann, "central parts of her life are a research desideratum"; there is still no "scientifically satisfactory biography". According to Caroline Galm, there have so far been "only small, scientifically based studies" available, for example by the historians David E. Barclay, Alexa Geisthövel, Georg Wagner-Kyora, Frank Lorenz Müller and Susanne Bauer. The Augusta biographies from the time of the German Empire lacked "any source basis and –depending on the author's political background– assessed the Empress either in a harmonizing, panegyric or grossly negative manner". According to Galm, biographies from the 1930s and 1940s also adhered to this tradition of representation, not least because protection periods made it impossible to evaluate the archive material. The most recently published biographies by the writer Helmut H. Schulz in 1996 and the historian Karin Feuerstein-Praßer in 2011 also did not provide any new insights and continued to view the Empress as a "visionary without power": Augusta would therefore have been concerned with political control of her husband However, at the latest since Bismarck's appointment as Prussian Prime Minister in 1862, she had been deprived of any opportunity to participate in politics. As a result, her only option was to promote charitable care. Historiography thus continued to follow Bismarck's Augusta assessment. The role of the Empress, like that of Emperor William I, remained largely unexplored historiographically in favor of a perspective that favored Bismarck. As Ulrich Lappenküper said at a conference in 2018, Augusta is sometimes still presented as a "petty politician" who "is said to have always schemed against Berlin politics".

==== Assessment of political scope for action ====
A research focus in the 21st century is Augusta's scope for political action and her self-image as a monarch's wife in the 19th century. According to Aschmann, research on Augusta is particularly interested in the fact that it was in conflict with "common patterns, gender expectations and political preferences of the time, not least the nationalist–militaristic mainstream". Galm points out that in the 19th century the wife of a monarch was not legally or normatively granted any political freedom of action. In practice, however, Augusta certainly had opportunities to participate politically. Her marriage was already motivated by foreign policy. She also had to fulfill representative tasks, took part in the upbringing of the children and was able to act as a political advisor to her husband. She also made many contacts and acted as an important social networker. According to the historian Jan Markert, Augusta's political influence was legally defined neither by the Prussian constitutions of 1848–1850 nor by the dynastic house law. However, she was particularly close to William I because of her dynastic position and her family connection. For this reason, in Markert's opinion, she was able to give certain groups of people access to the king or influence Wilhelm through conversations and correspondence. Markert judges that Augusta failed overall to "convince William of ideas that contradicted his personal monarchical perception of reality". The monarch therefore only consulted them in order to concretize his political program. During the time of the Prussian constitutional conflict, their opinions diverged so widely that joint discussions were hardly possible anymore. While Augusta followed old liberal ideas, William was more conservative. Furthermore, the King did not inform his wife about all the issues.

Georg Wagner-Kyora attaches little importance to Augusta's "talks about Wilhelm's foreign and domestic policy". Nevertheless, they often discussed political reports in the daily press while having breakfast together. Augusta and William also spent time together at dinner. Frank Lorenz Müller sees Augusta's political influence only limited to two areas, the education of the heir to the throne Friedrich Wilhelm and his marriage into the liberal British royal family. Augusta has certainly achieved success in this regard. Frederick William was politically closer to his mother than William, which was publicly recognized in Great Britain. However, the early death of the future emperor due to cancer after only 99 days in office made Augusta's mission less effective.

==== Research into epistolary correspondence ====
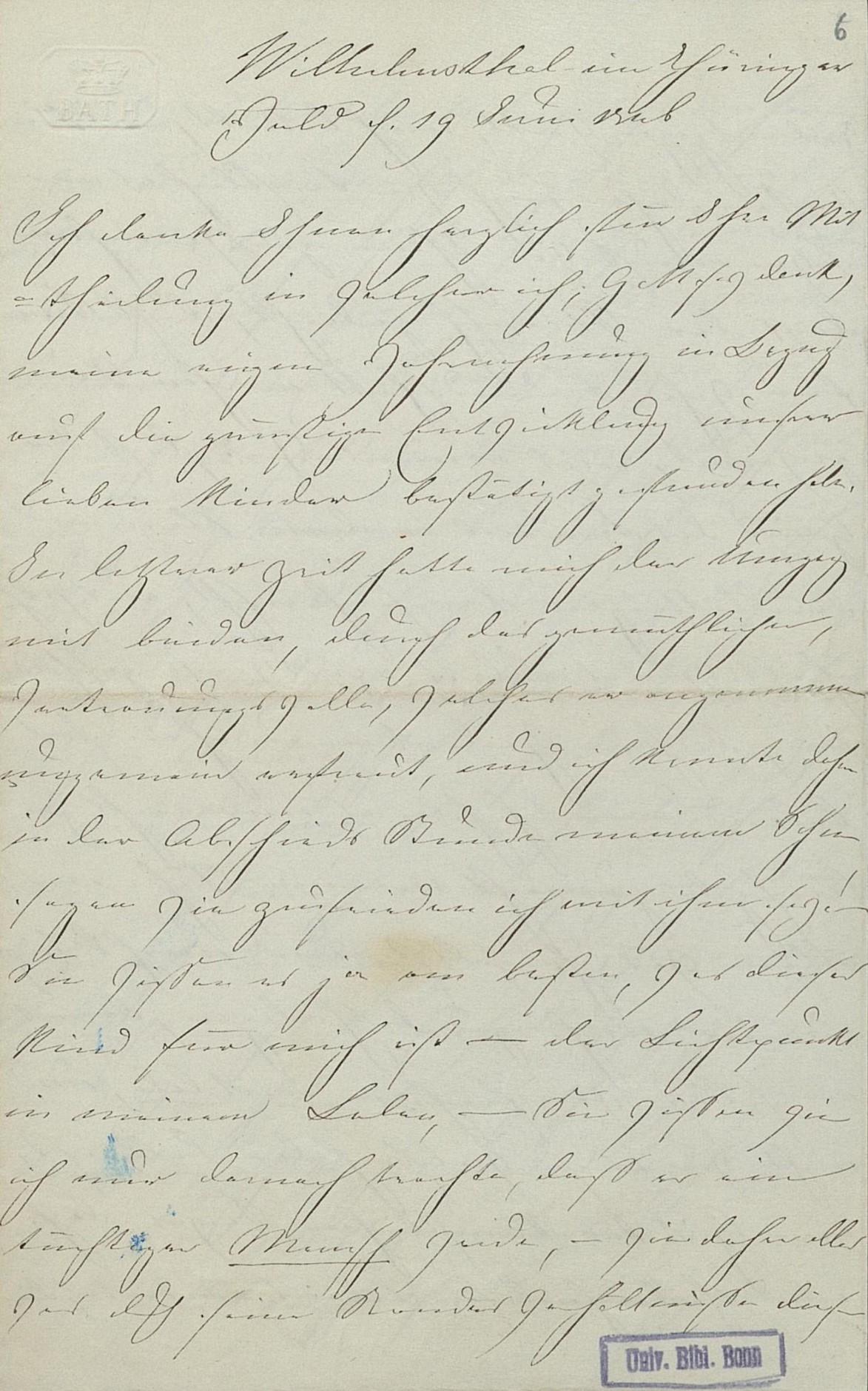
First page of a letter from Augusta to Ernst Curtius dated 19 June 1846.

Augusta's epistolary correspondence is considered the most important source. Historian Susanne Bauer found that Augusta was in correspondence with 486 people. So far, 22,086 letters are known. Most of them are aimed at princes with whom Augusta was related. Augusta exchanged views on both family and political topics. She used the letters to gain information and to exert influence on those around her. Bauer sees the letters as the only significant instrument through which Augusta was able to participate in political events. The surviving written correspondence between Wilhelm and Augusta comprises around 5,800 letters and is considered an important source for the relationship between the monarch couple. In addition to other princes, Augusta also communicated with statesmen, officers, scientists and writers. In addition to Bauer, Caroline Galm also participated in the analysis of the correspondence. She is particularly concerned with the correspondence between William and Augusta. In this way, Galm would like to find out "whether there was political cooperation between the two spouses, and if so, what this looked like". According to Galm, correspondence with "politically similar class members" also played a key role in Augusta's political letter network. The crucial question was whether actors such as the British Queen Victoria or the Grand Duke of Baden, Frederick II, took her seriously as important political allies or merely saw her as a "relationship broker" close to the German Emperor.

== Honours ==
- Kingdom of Prussia:
  - Dame of the Black Eagle, with Collar, 18 October 1861
  - Dame of the Order of Louise, 1st Division
  - Cross of Merit for Women and Girls, 9 April 1871
- Kingdom of Portugal: Dame of the Order of Queen Saint Isabel
- Russian Empire: Grand Cross of St. Catherine, in Diamonds, 12 December 1811
- Spain: Dame of the Order of Queen Maria Luisa, 20 May 1863
- Mexican Empire: Grand Cross of St. Charles, 10 April 1865
- Kingdom of Saxony: Dame of the Order of Sidonia, 1871

== Ancestry ==
Ancestors of Augusta of Saxe-Weimar-Eisenach

8. Ernest Augustus II, Duke of Saxe-Weimar-Eisenach
4. Charles Augustus, Grand Duke of Saxe-Weimar-Eisenach
9. Duchess Anna Amalia of Brunswick-Wolfenbüttel
2. Charles Frederick, Grand Duke of Saxe-Weimar-Eisenach
10. Louis IX, Landgrave of Hesse-Darmstadt
5. Princess Louise of Hesse-Darmstadt
11. Countess Palatine Caroline of Zweibrücken
1. Augusta of Saxe-Weimar-Eisenach
12. Peter III of Russia
6. Paul I of Russia
13. Catherine II of Russia
3. Grand Duchess Maria Pavlovna of Russia
14. Frederick II Eugene, Duke of Württemberg
7. Duchess Sophie Dorothea of Württemberg
15. Princess Friederike of Brandenburg-Schwedt

== Bibliography ==
- Angelow, Jürgen (2006). Frank-Lothar Kroll: Preußens Herrscher. Von den ersten Hohenzollern bis Wilhelm II. (ed.). Wilhelm I. (1861–1888) (in German). Munich: Beck. pp. 242–264. ISBN 978-3-406-54129-2.
- Aschmann, Birgit (2020). Susanne Brockfeld, Ingeborg Schnelling-Reinicke: Karrieren in Preußen – Frauen in Männerdomänen. (ed.). Königin Augusta als "political player" (in German). Berlin: Duncker & Humblot. pp. 271–290. ISBN 978-3-428-18035-6.
- Barclay, David E. (2004). Jochen Klauß: "Ihre Kaiserliche Hoheit" Maria Pawlowna – Zarentochter am Weimarer Hof (ed.). Großherzogliche Mutter und kaiserliche Tochter im Spannungsfeld der deutschen Politik. Maria Pawlowna, Augusta und der Weimarer Einfluß auf Preußen (1811–1890) (in German). Munich/Berlin: Deutscher Kunstverlag. pp. 77–82. ISBN 3-422-06516-4. Download (museum edition) [retrieved 24 March 2024]
- Engelberg, Ernst (1990). Bismarck. Das Reich in der Mitte Europas (in German). Berlin: Siedler. ISBN 3-88680-385-6.
- Feuerstein-Praßer, Karin (2011). Augusta. Kaiserin und Preußin (in German). Munich: Piper. ISBN 978-3-492-26456-3.
- Feuerstein-Praßer, Karin (1997). Die deutschen Kaiserinnen 1871–1918 (in German). Regensburg: Pustet. ISBN 3-7917-1545-3.
- Fischer, Robert-Tarek (2020). Wilhelm I. Vom preußischen König zum ersten Deutschen Kaiser (in German). Köln: Böhlau. ISBN 978-3-412-51926-1.
- Gall, Lothar (1980). Bismarck. Der weiße Revolutionär (in German). Frankfurt am Main: Propyläen. ISBN 3-549-07397-6.
- Galm, Caroline (2022). Anmerkungen zum politischen Handlungs- und Gestaltungsraum der Königin. Das Beispiel Augusta von Preußen (in German). Forschungen zur Brandenburgischen und Preußischen Geschichte 32. pp. 53–70.
- Galm, Caroline (2020). Integrative "Beziehungsarbeit". Augusta von Preußen und ihr politischer Umgang mit der katholischen Bevölkerung (in German). Michael Borchard, Thomas Brechenmacher, Günter Buchstab, Hans-Otto Kleinmann, Hanns Jürgen Küsters: Historisch-politische Mitteilungen 27. pp. 27–49. ISBN 978-3-412-52147-9.
- Galm, Caroline (2018). Augusta – "Visionärin ohne Macht"? Eine politische Biografie der ersten deutschen Kaiserin (Arbeitstitel) (in German). Research Center Sanssouci für Wissen und Gesellschaft (RECS). recs.hypotheses.org [retrieved 24 March 2024]
- Geisthövel, Alexa (2005). Ute Frevert, Heinz-Gerhard Haupt: Neue Politikgeschichte. Perspektiven einer historischen Politikforschung. (ed.). Augusta-Erlebnisse: Repräsentation der preußischen Königin 1870 (in German). Frankfurt am Main/New York: Campus. pp. 82–114. ISBN 978-3-593-37735-3.
- Gohrenz, Beate; Kotzian, Sabrina; Neuhäuser, Simone (2017). "Dieser für mich so reiche Glückstag". Der Besuch Augustas am 25. Juli 1864. | Augusta von Preußen. Die Königin zu Gast in Branitz. Ausstellungskatalog der Stiftung Fürst-Pückler-Museum Park und Schloss Branitz (in German). Edition Branitz 13. pp. 31–45.
- Heinrich, Gerd (1984). Geschichte Preußens. Staat und Dynastie (in German). Frankfurt am Main: Ullstein. ISBN 978-3-548-34216-0.
- Jena, Detlef (2007). Friedrich (ed.). Das Weimarer Quartett. Die Fürstinnen Anna Amalia, Louise, Maria Pawlowna, Sophie (in German). Regensburg: Pustet. ISBN 978-3-7917-2044-9.
- Jena, Detlef (2013). Carl Friedrich. Großherzog von Sachsen-Weimar-Eisenach (in German). Regensburg: Verlag Friedrich Pustet. ISBN 978-3-7917-2520-8.
- Klaus, Monica (2021). Sophie von Erlach. Eine Schweizerin und Preußin (in German). Göttingen: Vandenhoeck & Ruprecht. ISBN 978-3-412-52255-1.
- Kolb, Eberhard (2014). Otto von Bismarck. Eine Biographie (in German). Munich: Beck. ISBN 978-3-406-66774-9.
- Markert, Jan (2022). "Ein System von Bismarcks Gnaden? Kaiser Wilhelm I. und seine Umgebung – Plädoyer für eine Neubewertung monarchischer Herrschaft in Preußen und Deutschland vor 1888". In Wolfram Pyta; Rüdiger Voigt (eds.). Zugang zum Machthaber (in German). Baden-Baden: Nomos. pp. 127–156. ISBN 978-3-8487-8577-3.
- Micke-Serin, Andrea (2017). Der politische Horizont droht und die Erfahrung predigt tauben Ohren. Augusta und die Politik. | Augusta von Preußen. Die Königin zu Gast in Branitz. Ausstellungskatalog der Stiftung Fürst-Pückler-Museum Park und Schloss Branitz (in German). Edition Branitz 13. pp. 59–69.
- Müller, Frank Lorenz (2011). Our Fritz. Emperor Frederick III and the Political Culture of Imperial Germany. Cambridge: Harvard University Press. ISBN 978-0-674-06269-6.
- Müller, Frank Lorenz (2015). "Frauenpolitik". Augusta, Vicky und die liberale Mission. | Ausstellungskatalog Frauensache. Wie Brandenburg Preußen wurde (in German). Dresden: Sandstein. pp. 252–259. ISBN 978-3-95498-142-7.
- Müller, Frank Lorenz (2015b). "Augusta und Victoria. Zwei Kaiserinnen auf liberaler Mission". Damals – Das Magazin für Geschichte 47 (in German). Dresden. pp. 40–44. ISSN 0011-5908.
- Nonn, Christoph (2015). Bismarck. Ein Preuße und sein Jahrhundert (in German). Munich: Beck. ISBN 978-3-406-67589-8.
- Pakula, Hannah (2002). "Victoria in Deutschland: Politische Zielvorstellungen der jungen Kronprinzessin". In Rainer von Hessen (ed.). Victoria Kaiserin Friedrich: Mission und Schicksal einer englischen Prinzessin in Deutschland (in German). Frankfurt am Main: Campus. pp. 69–79. ISBN 978-3-593-38407-8.
- Peiffer, Bastian (2012). Alexander von Schleinitz und die preußische Außenpolitik 1858–1861 (in German). Frankfurt am Main/Berlin/Bern/Brussels/New York/Oxford/Vienna: Peter Lang Verlag. ISBN 978-3-631-62354-1.
- Pflanze, Otto (1997). Bismarck. Der Reichsgründer (in German). Munich: Beck. ISBN 3-406-42725-1.
- Pflanze, Otto (2008). Bismarck. Der Reichsgründer (in German). Vol. 2. Munich: Beck. ISBN 978-3-406-54823-9.
- Rose, Andreas (2018). "Die "alte Fregatte" und ihr "Todfeind". Augusta und der "Eiserne Kanzler"". In Truc Vu Minh; Jürgen Luh (eds.). Die Welt verbessern: Augusta von Preußen und Fürst Pückler-Muskau. Kulturgeschichte Preußens – Colloquien 7 (in German).
- Rausch, Helke (2006). Kultfigur und Nation. Öffentliche Denkmäler in Paris, Berlin und London 1848-1914 (in German). Pariser Historische Studien 70. ISBN 978-3-486-57579-8.
- Schönpflug, Daniel (2013). Die Heiraten der Hohenzollern. Verwandtschaft, Politik und Ritual in Europa 1640–1918 (= Kritische Studien zur Geschichtswissenschaft. Band 207) (in German). Göttingen: Vandenhoeck & Ruprecht. ISBN 978-3-525-37030-8.
- Steinberg, Jonathan (2012). Bismarck. Magier der Macht (in German). Berlin: Propyläen. ISBN 978-3-549-07416-9.
- Wagner-Kyora, Georg (2007). Beruf Kaiserin. Die mediale Repräsentation der preußisch-deutschen Kaiserinnen 1871–1918 | Historische Anthropologie 15 (Band 15). pp. 339–371. Download [retrieved 24 March 2024] doi:10.7788/ha.2007.15.3.339
- Wilhelmy, Petra (1989). Der Berliner Salon im 19. Jahrhundert (1780–1914) (= Veröffentlichungen der Historischen Kommission zu Berlin. Band 73) (in German). Berlin/New York: Walter de Gruyter. ISBN 3-11-011891-2. (also dissertation, University of Münster, 1987).
- Zerwas, Marco (2015). Lernort 'Deutsches Eck'. Zur Variabilität geschichtskultureller Deutungsmuster Geschichtsdidaktische Studien (in German). Berlin: Logos. ISBN 978-3-8325-3856-9.

Augusta of Saxe-Weimar-Eisenach House of Saxe-Weimar-Eisenach Cadet branch of the House of Wettin Born: 30 September 1811 Died: 7 January 1890
German royalty
Preceded by Elisabeth Ludovika of Bavaria	Queen consort of Prussia; 2 January 1861 – 9 March 1888	Succeeded by Victoria, Princess Royal
Vacant Title last held by Maria Theresa of Naples and Sicily as German Queen	German Empress consort 18 January 1871 – 9 March 1888	Succeeded by Victoria, Princess Royal
