= Vaterländischer Frauenverein =

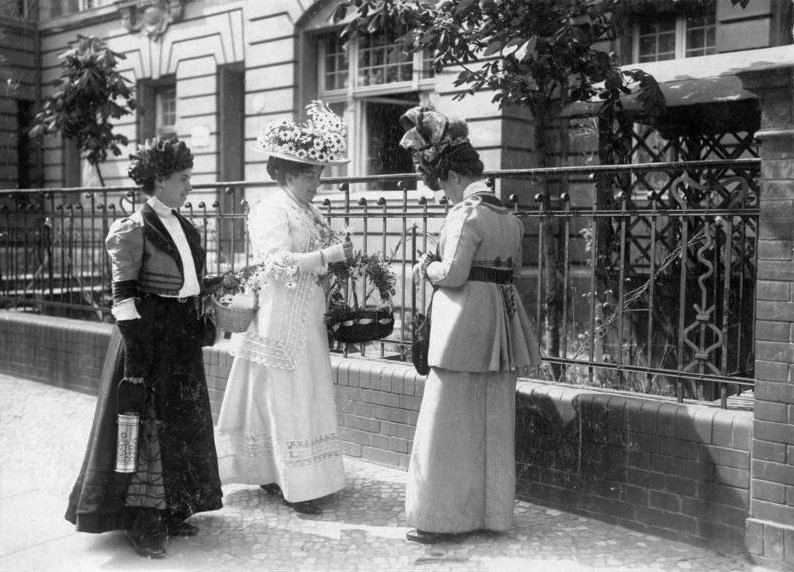
VFV street vendors in Berlin, on Marguerite Day, 1911

Vaterländischer Frauenverein (acronym, VFV; English translation, "Patriotic Women's Association"; long form, "German Women's Association for the Care and Aid of War Wounded") was founded by the Prussian Queen (later German Empress) Augusta on 11 November 1866. Initially, its reach was only the city of Berlin.

== History ==
The foundation in 1866, during the Austro-Prussian War, soon gave rise to the first branch associations, which subsequently became the forerunners of the German Red Cross women's associations in the various regions of the German Empire. The first associations of this kind in Germany were the VFV in Koblenz, Hamburg, and Kassel, established between 1866 and 1869. On 18 July 1870, one was founded in Lübeck just before the outbreak of the Franco-Prussian War. VFV was established in Bonn, as well as numerous other places.

During World War I, VFV set up war kindergartens. Club hospitals were operated for wounded warriors. All over Germany, the half million women of the VFV had prepared so that, "when war comes," they had taken a first aid nurse's training course. In the first month of the war, no less than 70,000 women of the VFV, trained in first aid to the injured, had arrived at the doors of the Reichstag to offer themselves for Red Cross service. The VFV assembled 29,000 women in Berlin alone to take the course of training arranged for helferinnen, assistants in all phases of relief work. In 1914, Cecilienhaus in Charlottenburg, with its crèche, maternity care, folks kitchens and its working people's gardens, was devoted to the welfare work in which the VFV of the nation was engaged.

Queen Louise Gabriele Marie von Itzenplitz (1839–1901) from the Itzenplitz noble family in Brandenburg was appointed the first chairwoman of the association. After the marriage of Louise Gabriele Marie von Itzenplitz, her sister, Countess Charlotte Clementine von Itzenplitz, took over the presidency and led the association for half a century from 1867 to 1916.
