= Birgit Aschmann =

German historian (born 1967)

Birgit Aschmann (born 8 January 1967) is a historian, originally from Hamburg in West Germany. Since April 2011 she has held a teaching chair in nineteenth century European History at the Humboldt University of Berlin. One focus of her work is on Spanish History in the nineteenth and twentieth centuries.

== Life ==
On leaving school, Aschmann embarked on a study course in Medicine, which lasted from 1986 till 1989. It was only then that she enrolled at the Christian-Albrecht University in Kiel for a study course that combined History, German and Spanish. Her student career included significant periods studying at Madrid, Málaga and Guayaquil (in Ecuador). She concluded her undergraduate studies in 1995 and spent the next three years working on a doctorate. Her doctorate, also from Kiel, addressed the relations between West Germany during the "Wirtschaftswunder years" and Spain under Franco. It was subsequently adapted for publication under the title "Treue Freunde...?: Westdeutschland und Spanien 1945 bis 1963". Between 1998 and 2000 she worked as an academic researcher at the Kiel University Institute for Modern and Contemporary History, having obtained a lectureship in 1998. She remained at Kiel as an academic counsellor ("Akademische Rätin") till 2003, after which she was a senior academic research assistant. Between 2004 and 2010 she was increasingly focused on her habilitation which she received for a dissertation entitled "Prussia's Glory and Germany's Honour: The Discourse on National Honour in the build-up to the Franco-Prussian War" ("Preußens Ruhm und Deutschlands Ehre. Der nationale Ehrdiskurs im Vorfeld der preußisch-französischen Kriege im 19. Jahrhundert"). Another work published during this period concerned the balance between Calculation and Emotion in driving the politics of the nineteenth and twentieth centuries.

Birgit Aschmann received a teaching chair in Modern and Contemporary History at Kiel in 2010. She moved the next year, however, taking the teaching chair in European Nineteenth Century at the Humboldt University of Berlin on 1 April 2011 in succession to Wolfgang Hardtwig.

== Works ==
- Aschmann, Birgit; Eckert, Andreas; Fahrmeir, Andreas; Habermas, Rebekka; Haupt, Heinz-Gerhard; Hirschhausen, Ulrike von; Langewiesche, Dieter; Lenger, Friedrich; Leonhard, Jörn; Planert, Ute; Schaser, Angelika; Schönpflug, Daniel; Wienfort, Monika; Campus Verlag (2019). Durchbruch der Moderne? neue Perspektiven auf das 19. Jahrhundert (in German). Frankfurt. ISBN 978-3-593-51087-3. OCLC 1097677309.
- Aschmann, Birgit; Herbers, Klaus; Böhlau-Verlag Köln (2022). Eine andere Geschichte Spaniens Schlüsselgestalten vom Mittelalter bis ins 20. Jahrhundert (in German). Köln. ISBN 978-3-412-52557-6. OCLC 1311492239.
