= Lepsius =

Lepsius is a German surname. Notable people with the surname include:

- Johannes Lepsius (1858–1926), German humanitarian
- Karl Richard Lepsius (1810–1884), Prussian Egyptologist
- Reinhold Lepsius (1857–1922), German painter
- Sabine Lepsius (1864–1942), German painter

== See also ==
- 55733 Lepsius, asteroid
