= Flag of Prussia =

German state flag from 1525 to 1947

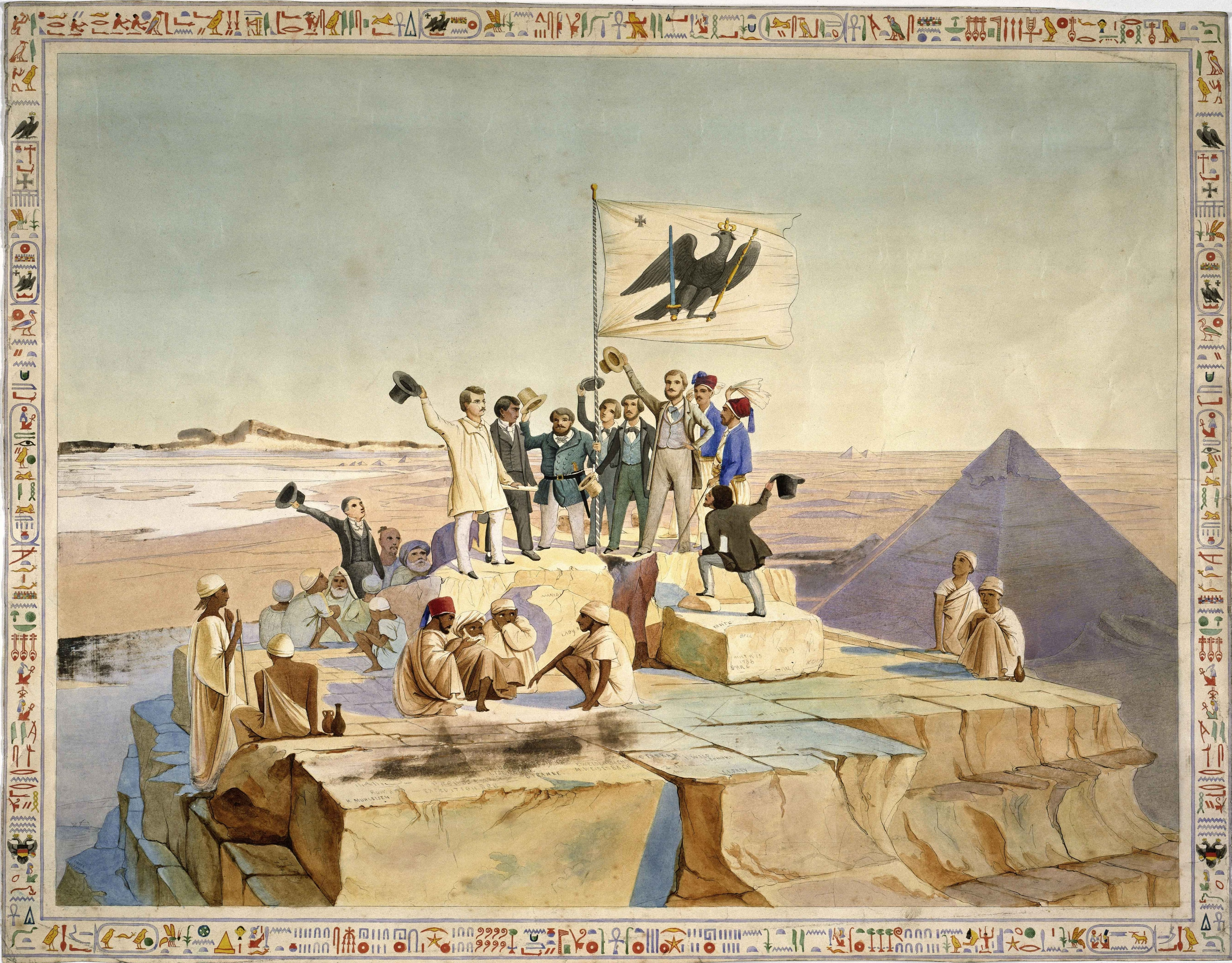
Karl Richard Lepsius and his team fly the Prussian flag from the top of the Pyramid of Cheops (painted by Johann Jakob Frey)

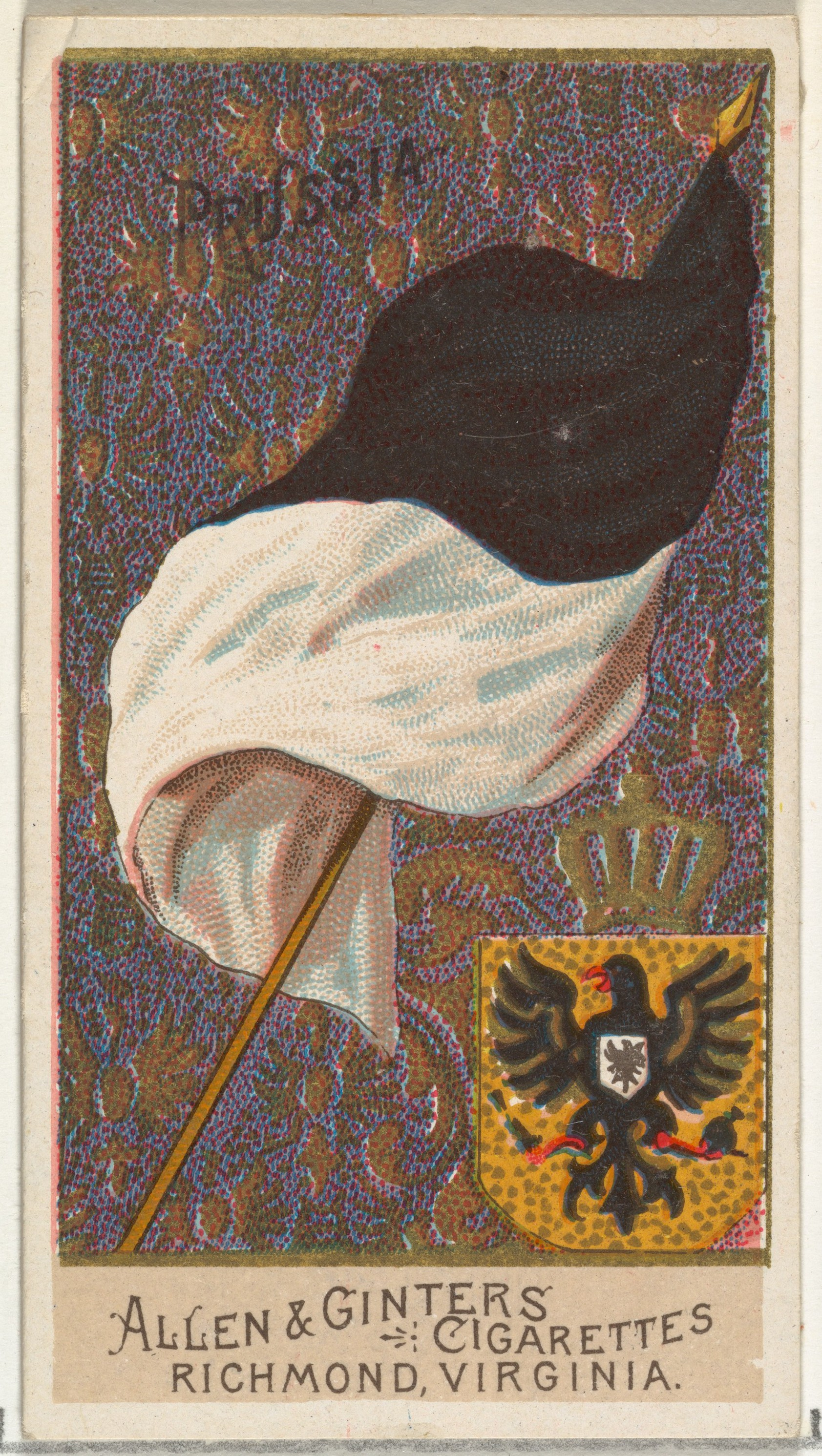
Prussian civil flag on an 1890 cigarette card

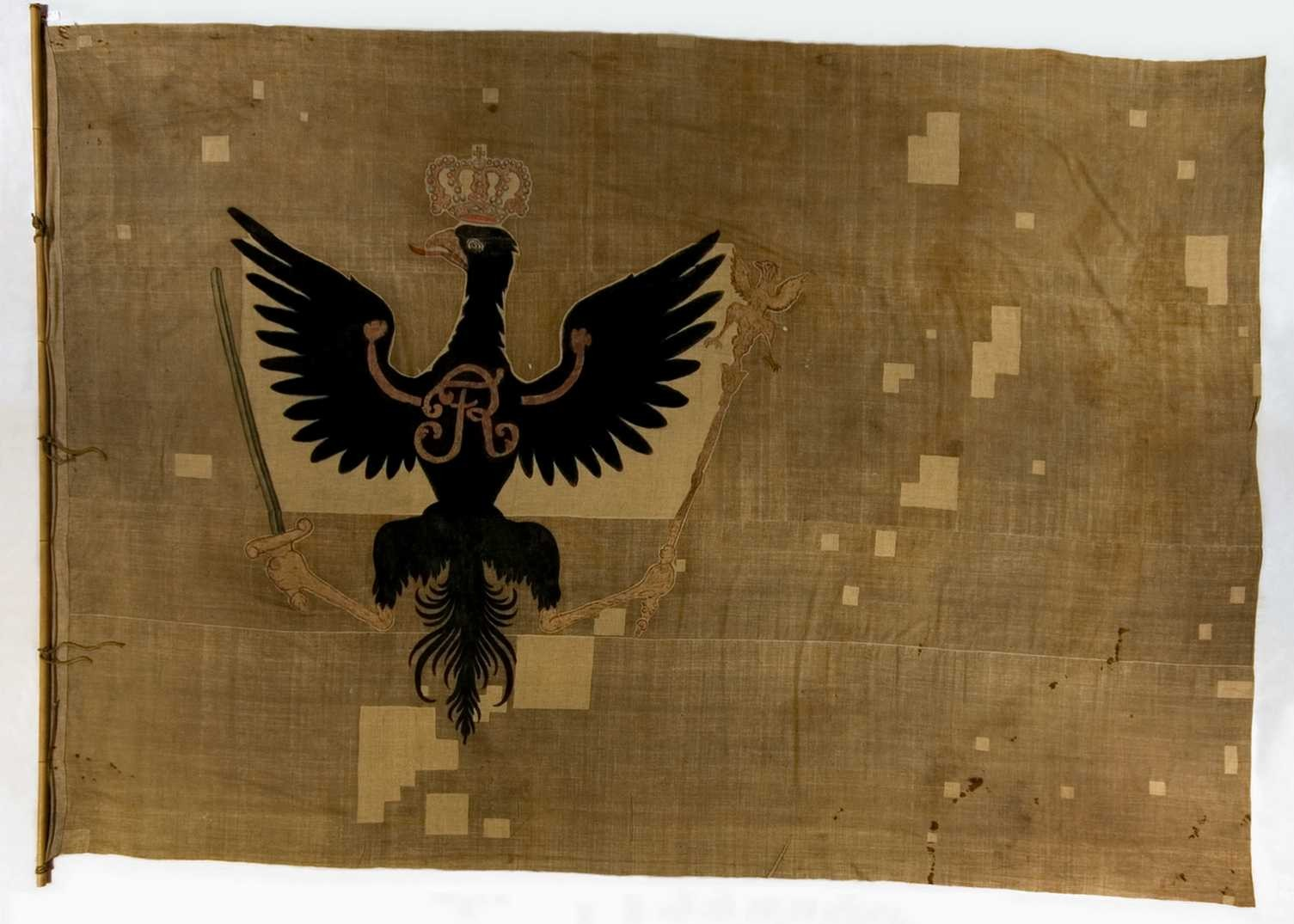
Prussian flag captured by Swedish soldiers during The Battle of Frisches Haff in 1759

The state of Prussia had its origins in the separate lands of the Margraviate of Brandenburg and of the Duchy of Prussia. The Margraviate of Brandenburg developed from the medieval Northern March of the Holy Roman Empire, passing to the House of Hohenzollern in 1415. The Duchy of Prussia originated in 1525 when Albert of Brandenburg-Ansbach, a member of a cadet branch of the Hohenzollern house, secularized the eastern lands of the Teutonic Knights as a Polish fief. Prince-elector John Sigismund, Elector of Brandenburg, inherited the Duchy of Prussia in 1618, thus uniting Brandenburg and Prussia under one ruler in a personal union; the Elector's state became known as Brandenburg-Prussia. The Kingdom of Prussia formed when Elector Frederick III assumed the title of Frederick I, King in Prussia, on 18 January 1701.

Hohenzollern monarchical rule of Prussia ceased in 1918 after the fall of the German Empire in the aftermath of World War I; the Kingdom becoming instead the Free State of Prussia. The Allied Control Council decreed the formal abolition of the state of Prussia in 1947 following World War II.

== Flags ==
The Prussian national and merchant flag was originally a simple black-white-black flag issued on May 22, 1818, but this was replaced on March 12, 1823, with a new flag. The revised one (3:5) was parted black, white, and black (1:4:1), showing in the white stripe the eagle with a blue orb bound in gold and a scepter ending in another eagle. On its breast were the intertwined initials FR for Fridericus Rex. The axis of the eagle is at two-fifths of the flag's total length.

The Prussian war flag (3:5), adopted November 28, 1816, was originally swallow-tailed for one-fifth of the total length; the tail was later abandoned. At two fifths it showed the Prussian eagle (two-thirds of the flag's height). In the canton, the Iron Cross was placed (one-third of the flag's height).

The Iron Cross was established in 1813 during the war against Napoleon I as a decoration for courageous common soldiers. It was renewed in the Franco-Prussian War of 1870 and in World War I. It also appeared in the canton of the war flag of the German Empire.

The royal standard of Prussia showed the Iron Cross charged with the shield and crown of the small state arms surrounded by the collar of the Order of the Black Eagle. On the blades of the cross is the motto Gott mit uns. Between the arms were Prussian eagles along the edges and a royal crown in carré with them, all on a purple or red background.

After the German Revolution of 1918–19, the Prussian state was slow to adapt its heraldry to republican forms. Only July 11, 1921, new arms were decreed by the Prussian prime minister. The 'gothic' eagle made way for the more natural-looking flying one and lost all its garments.

On December 16, 1921, the Ministry of State decreed that the Prussian flag was to be only black and white.

On February 24 and April 23, 1922, the ministry issued a service flag similar to the national flag of the 19th century – black borders above and below, being one-sixth of the total height of the flag, with the new eagle.

The Germany national football team home dress has always been a white jersey and black shorts, the colors of the Prussian flag.

== Gallery ==
Flag of Royal Prussia
(1466–1772)

Flag of the Duchy of Prussia
(1525–1657)

State flag of the Kingdom of Prussia
(1701–1750)

State flag of the Kingdom of Prussia
(1750–1801)

State flag of the Kingdom of Prussia
(1801–1803)

State flag of the Kingdom of Prussia
(1803–1892)

State flag of the Kingdom of Prussia
(1892–1918)

Flag of the Free State of Prussia
(1918–1933)
(disputed)

Civil flag of Prussia
(1701–1935)

Civil ensign of the Kingdom of Prussia
(1892–1918)

War flag of Prussia
(1816)

War flag of Prussia
(1895–1918)

Royal Standard of the King of Prussia
(1871–1918)

Standard of the Crown Prince
(1871–1892)

Civil ensign and Merchant flag of the Kingdom of Prussia
(1823–1863)

Civil ensign and Merchant flag of the Kingdom of Prussia
(1863–1892)

Service flag of the Free State of Prussia
(1933–1935)

== See also ==
- Coat of arms of Germany
- Coat of arms of Prussia
- Flag of Buenos Aires
- List of German flags
- Reichskriegsflagge
