= Denkmäler aus Ägypten und Äthiopien =

Documentation of the Prussian scientific expedition to Egypt and Nubia in the 1840s

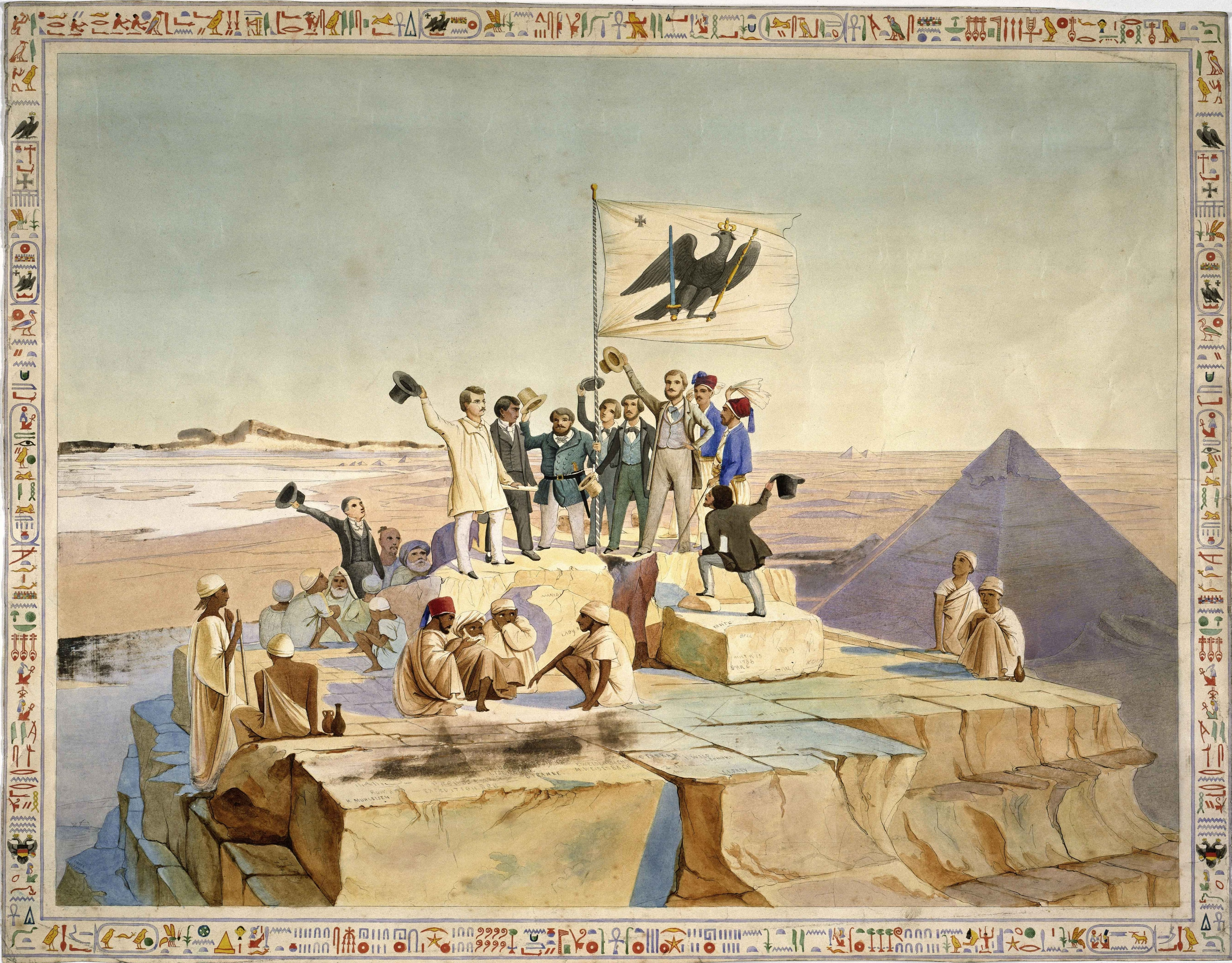
- Illustration by Johann Jakob Frey of the Prussian expedition on top of the Great Pyramid, 1842
- Author: Karl Richard Lepsius
- Language: German
- Published: 1849–1859
- Publication place: Prussia
- Media type: Book

Denkmäler aus Ägypten und Äthiopien (literally "Monuments from Egypt and Ethiopia", where "Ethiopia" was then a synonym for Nubia) is a monumental work by Karl Richard Lepsius published in Prussia in 1849–1859. Like the French Description de l'Égypte, published forty years previously, the work is still regularly consulted by Egyptologists today.

It records the scientific documentation obtained by Lepsius's Prussian expedition to Egypt and Nubia from 1842–1845 in order to gather knowledge about the local monuments of ancient Egyptian civilization. This expedition was modelled after the earlier Napoléonic mission, and consisted of surveyors, draftsmen, and other specialists. The mission reached Giza in November 1842 and spent six months making some of the first scientific studies of the pyramids of Giza, Abusir, Saqqara, and Dahshur. They discovered 67 pyramids, recorded in the pioneering Lepsius list of pyramids, and more than 130 tombs. During the mission, the Prussian team collected around 15,000 objects and plaster casts, which today form the core of the collection of the Egyptian Museum of Berlin.

The work was published in twelve large-format volumes, later supplemented by five volumes of notes. It contains highly accurate maps for its time, as well as nearly 900 plates of monuments and copies of inscriptions.

== Contents ==
Abtheilung I Topographie und Architektur (Section I: Topography and Architecture)

- Vol. I: Blatt I-LXVI
- Vol. II: Blatt LXVII-CXLV

Abtheilung II Denkmäler des Alten Reichs (Section II: Monuments Of The Old Kingdom)

- Vol. III: Blatt I-LXXXI
- Vol. IV: Blatt LXXXII-CLIII

Abtheilung III Denkmäler des Neuen Reichs (Section III: Monuments Of The New Kingdom)

- Vol. V: Blatt I-XC
- Vol. VI: Blatt XCI-CLXXII
- Vol. VII: Blatt CLXXIII-CCXLII
- Vol. VIII: Blatt CCXLIII-CCCIV

Abtheilung IV Denkmäler aus der Zeit der griechischen und römischen Herrschaft (Section IV Monuments from the Period of Greek and Roman Domination)

- Vol. IX: Blatt I-XC

Abtheilung V Äthiopische Denkmäler (Section V Ethiopian Monuments)

- Vol. X: Blatt I-LXXV

Abtheilung VI Inschriften mit Ausschluss der Hieroglyphischen (Section VI: Inscriptions Excluding Hieroglyphic Sheets)

- Vol. XI: Blatt I-LXIX
- Vol. XII: Blatt LXX-CXXVII

== See also ==
- Lepsius list of pyramids
- Lepsius Standard Alphabet
