= Johann Jakob Frey =

Swiss painter (1813–1865)

- Born: 27 January 1813; Basel, Switzerland
- Died: 30 September 1865 (aged 52); Frascati, Italy
- Known for: Landscape painting

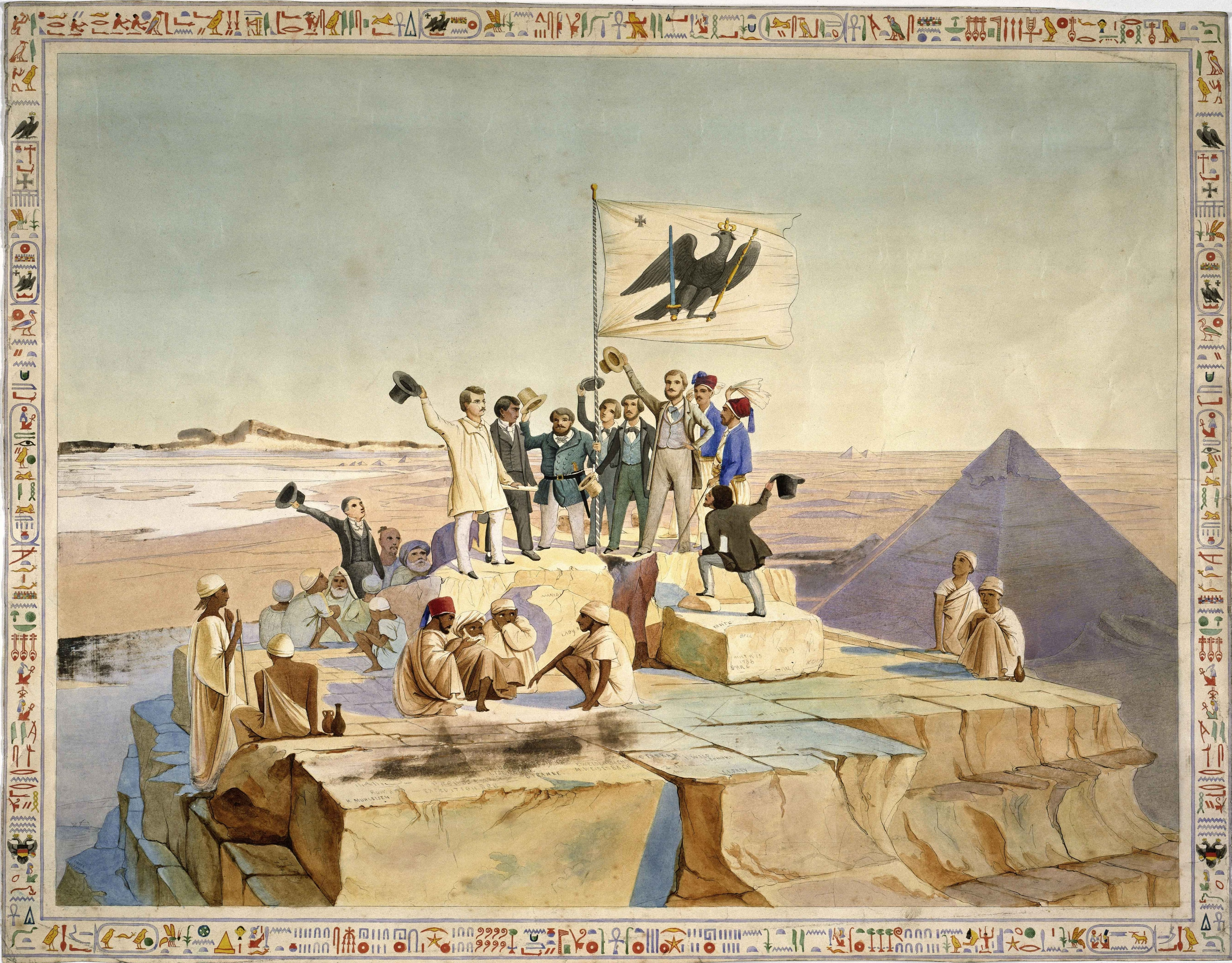
Frey with members of the Lepsius expedition on the Cheops pyramid, 1842. He appears in the group at bottom right.

Johann Jakob Frey (27 January 1813 – 30 September 1865) was a Swiss landscape painter. Born in Basel, he trained with his father Samuel Frey and Hieronymus Hess before moving to Italy. He settled in Rome and joined Karl Richard Lepsius’s Prussian expedition to Egypt. His work drew on travels in Italy, Spain, Greece and Egypt, and his patrons included Ludwig I of Bavaria and Frederick William IV of Prussia.

== Biography ==
Johann Jakob Frey was born in Basel on 27 January 1813. The son of the engraver Samuel Frey, he received early drawing instruction from his father and from Hieronymus Hess.

After time in Paris and Munich, Frey moved to Italy in 1835 with the support of the Basel patron Emilie Linder, settling in Rome the following year. His early Italian subjects were based on journeys through central Italy, including the Roman Campagna, the Sabine Hills, Latium and Umbria. In 1839, he visited southern Italy and made drawings at Paestum. He travelled to Sicily the following year. By the early 1840s, he was selling works regularly to an international clientele, especially English and German travellers.

Frey met the Egyptologist Karl Richard Lepsius in Rome and joined his Prussian expedition to Egypt in 1842. He returned to Europe in August 1843 because of illness. After returning to Rome, he established a studio where foreign visitors bought paintings and drawings based on his travels in Egypt, Greece and Sicily. His work also attracted royal patrons, including Ludwig I of Bavaria and Frederick William IV of Prussia.

In 1848, Frey left Rome during the political unrest and travelled to Spain, where he studied Moorish monuments and Andalusian landscapes. Frey returned to Rome in 1850. In 1854, he married Magdalena Bartoli. In his final years, Frey lived at his country house in Frascati and continued to travel in Europe. He died in Frascati on 30 September 1865.

== Work ==
Frey was a landscape painter whose subjects included Italian, Spanish and Greek landscapes, as well as Egyptian antiquities. His Italian views reflected the influence of classical landscape painting, while his coloured pen drawings from the Egyptian expedition had a more personal character. In Rome, he developed an independent, often vivid use of colour, and his later paintings became more naturalistic.

Works by Frey are held by institutions including the Kunstmuseum Basel, the Museum der Bildenden Künste in Leipzig, the Victoria and Albert Museum in London and the Kunstmuseum St. Gallen.

== Gallery ==
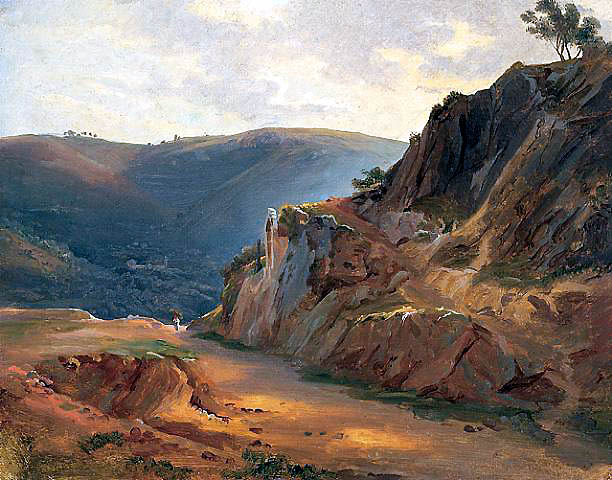
Path in the Mountains Above Rome, c. 1840

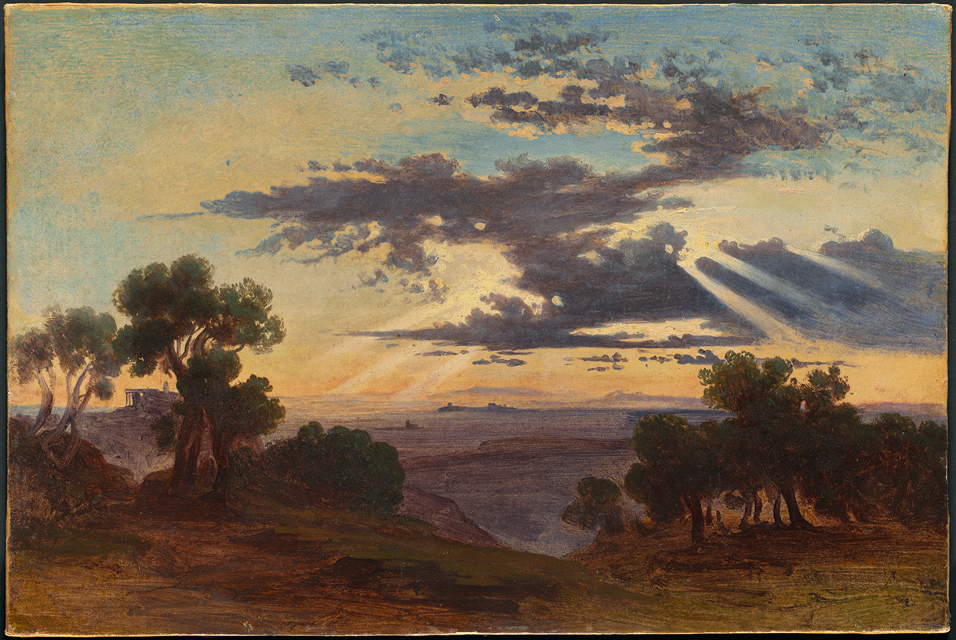
Sun Breaking through Clouds above the Roman Campagna, after 1844

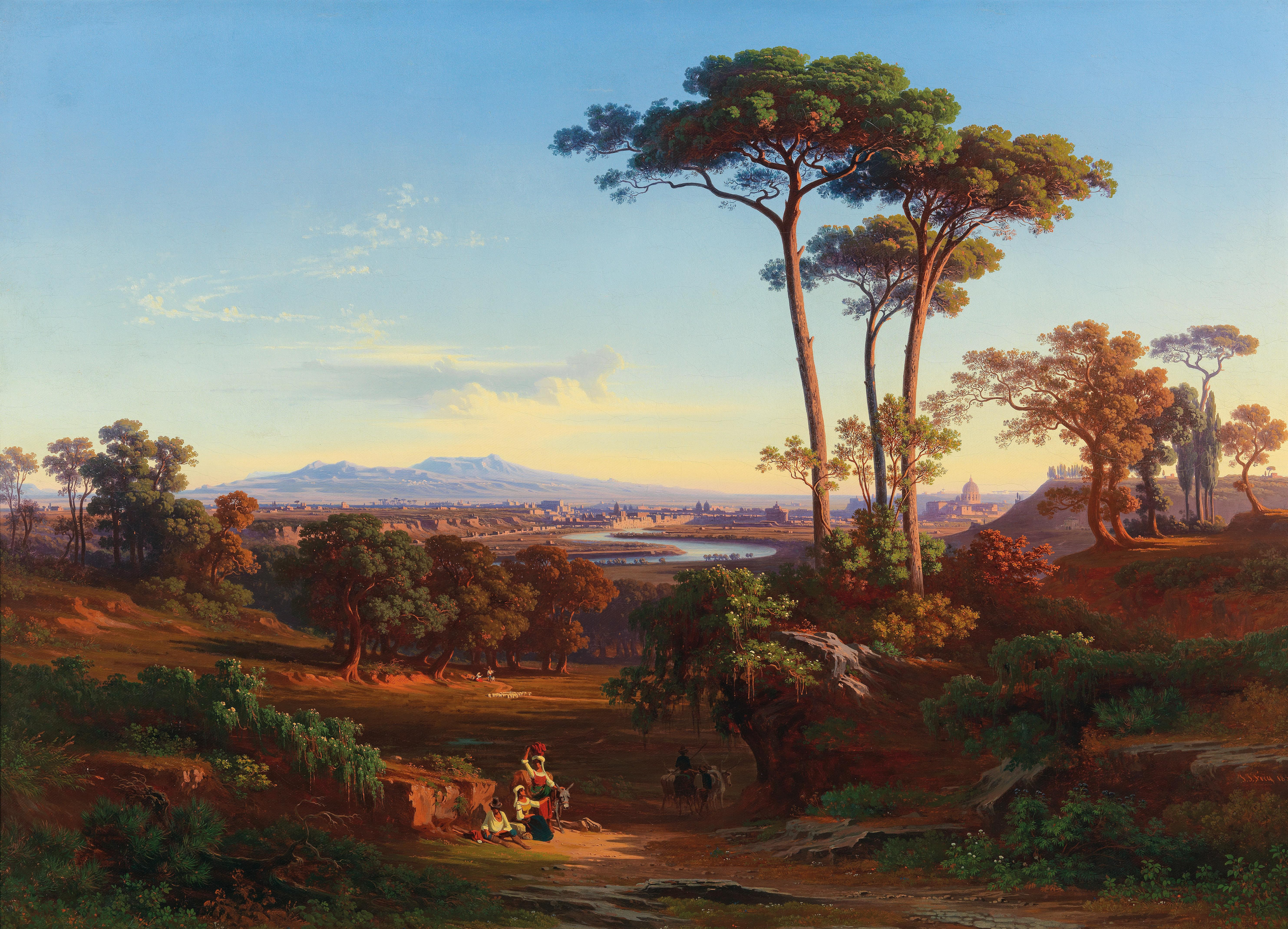
View of Rome from Monte Mario, 1850

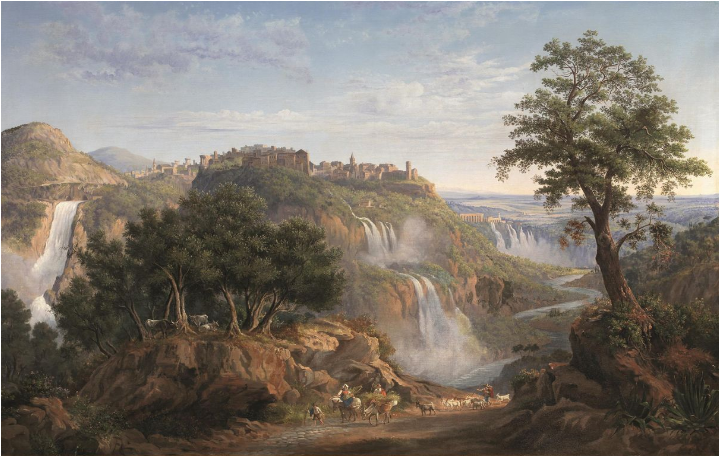
View of Tivoli, by 1865

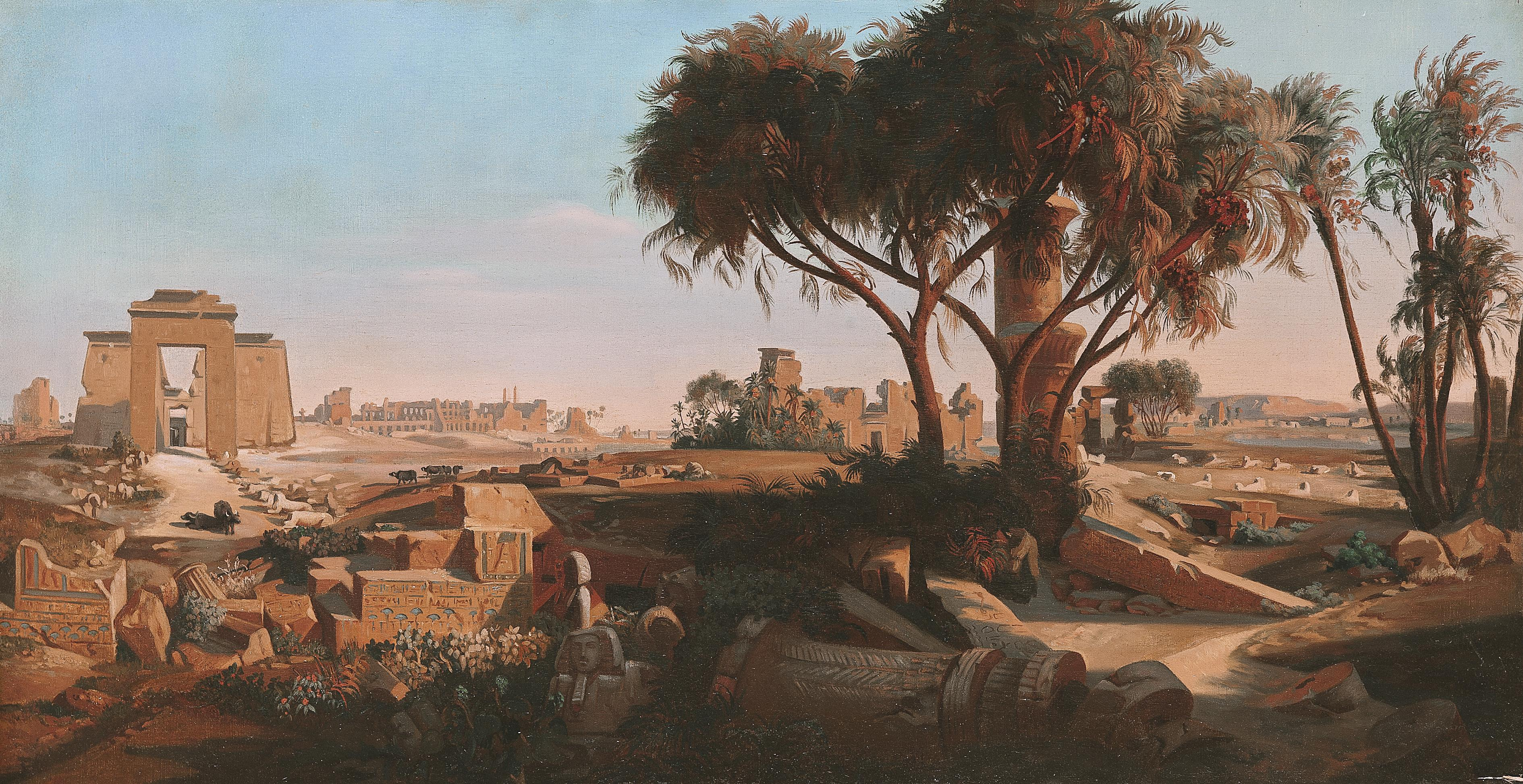
View of Karnak in Egypt

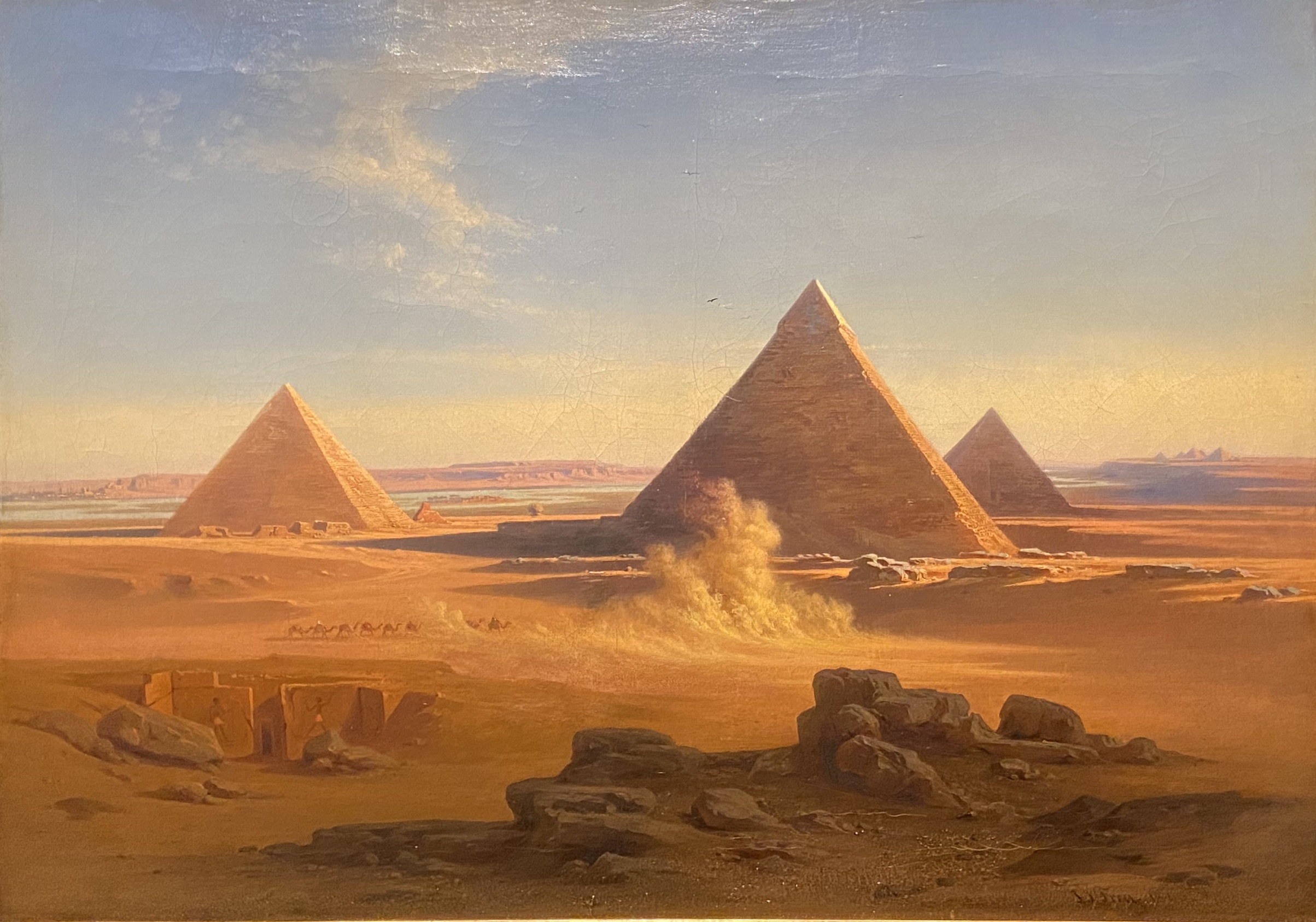
Pyramids of Giza
