= Departure of King Wilhelm I for the Army, July 31, 1870 =

Painting by Adolph Menzel

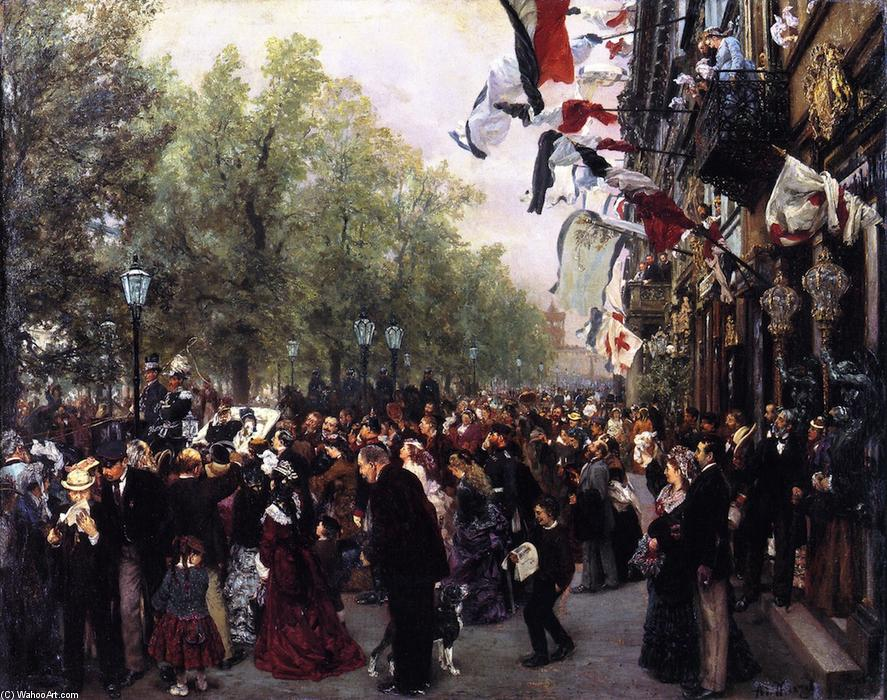
- Artist: Adolph Menzel
- Year: 1871
- Medium: oil on canvas
- Dimensions: 63 cm × 78 cm (25 in × 31 in)
- Location: Alte Nationalgalerie, Berlin

Departure of King Wilhelm I for the Army, July 31, 1870 is an oil on canvas painting by German artist Adolph Menzel, created in 1871. It depicts a scene that takes place in the avenue Unter den Linden, in Berlin, where a crowd is paying tribute to King Wilhelm I of Prussia, as he passes in an open carriage, on his way to the Franco-Prussian War, who had started two weeks earlier. The painting is part of the collection of the Alte Nationalgalerie, in Berlin, since 1881.

== History ==
In the summer of 1870, Menzel was on vacation in Switzerland, which he cut short after the outbreak of the Franco-Prussian War. According to tradition, he was sitting in a restaurant on the first floor of the Linden in Berlin on July 31, 1870, and was thus able to witness the king's departure for the army. Menzel wrote that he did the painting with his left hand, as for example those from his series about Frederick II. Significantly, Menzel, originally left-handed, had learned the ability to work equally well with both hands. For reasons of lighting in the composition, he chose the right hand for the preliminary drawing and the left hand for the painterly part. Max Jordan assumed the painter's position to be on the south side of the Linden near the Russian Embassy, not far from the Brandenburg Gate. But the neo-baroque facades on the right do not match. This then-modern type of ornate architecture was under construction on Friedrichstrasse. At that time, a late-classical style prevailed on Unter den Linden. Elsewhere it is said that Menzel reported that “on July 31, 1870 he was on his way to the hairdresser’s when he suddenly saw the king’s carriage on Unter den Linden. The farewell waves and various shouts would have made it clear to him that Wilhelm was about to leave the capital in order to travel to the troops marching up on the Rhine."

Menzel made several sketches for this painting, which are in various museums. The title of the painting was initially Unter den Linden in Berlin in the afternoon of July 31, 1870 or The Linden in Berlin in the afternoon of July 31, 1870, which was used in the first exhibitions; later this title was dropped.

== Description ==
In this painting, Menzel depicts the boulevard Unter den Linden, in Berlin, in a strongly perspective composition. A huge crowd cheers the Prussian King Wilhelm I, who is sitting next to his wife in a carriage and is heading towards the Brandenburg Gate to reach the Berlin Potsdamer Bahnhof. Wilhelm traveled to the theater of war as commander-in-chief of the armies of the North German Confederation and the southern German states, whose deployment across the Rhine was almost complete. The Berlin Palace is in the background of the painting, but the other royal buildings, such as the royal operas don't appear at all. The tower of the recently completed Red Town Hall, on the other hand, is painted more clearly, which points to the increasing importance of the bourgeoisie after the war had been won (Menzel completed the painting in 1871 after the war). Both the shadowy castle and the town hall are the only buildings that can be clearly identified. The bourgeois façades on the right edge of the picture, on the other hand, are fictitious and appear oversized in their almost vertical perspective cornice line due to the strong view from below. With her neo-baroque decorations, it could be a depiction of an in the foreground; these building facades represent the prosperity of the self-celebrating bourgeoisie in a time of economic upswing.

Apparently, a strong gust of wind is blowing through the street, swirling the patriotic flag decorations. The flags on Linden-Boulevard present not only the intertwined federal flags but also the black and white Prussian flags, but these are hardly swirled. A special feature is the easily recognizable flag of the Red Cross, which is located almost in the vanishing point of the painting. Here Menzel refers to the victims of wars, which were always important to him. Some of his drawings and watercolors deal with them.

Amidst the crowd's obedient homage, cheers and cheering gestures, the monarch's white-lined carriage provides a stark contrast that draws the viewer's attention. The King salutes with his right hand on his spiked helmet, while in the real scene he was wearing a simple "traveller's hat"; his wife Augusta fights back the tears and holds a handkerchief in front of her face. Some figures turn away from the King and are busy with other things, some are clearly identifiable. The buyer of the painting, the banker and friend of Menzel, Magnus Herrmann, is said to be on the back balcony with his wife. Herrmann's daughter Clara and her husband, the painter Albert Hertel, can also be seen in the front right. The man in the foreground, who has his back turned to the events, wears a conspicuously light-colored hat and appears to be drawing something on a piece of paper, he is believed by the historian Susanne Drexler to be a self-portrait of Menzel. Menzel's historical paintings often contain a humorous, genre-like component. In this case, it is the newsboy who is baring his teeth at the dog.
