= Gustav Graef =

German painter

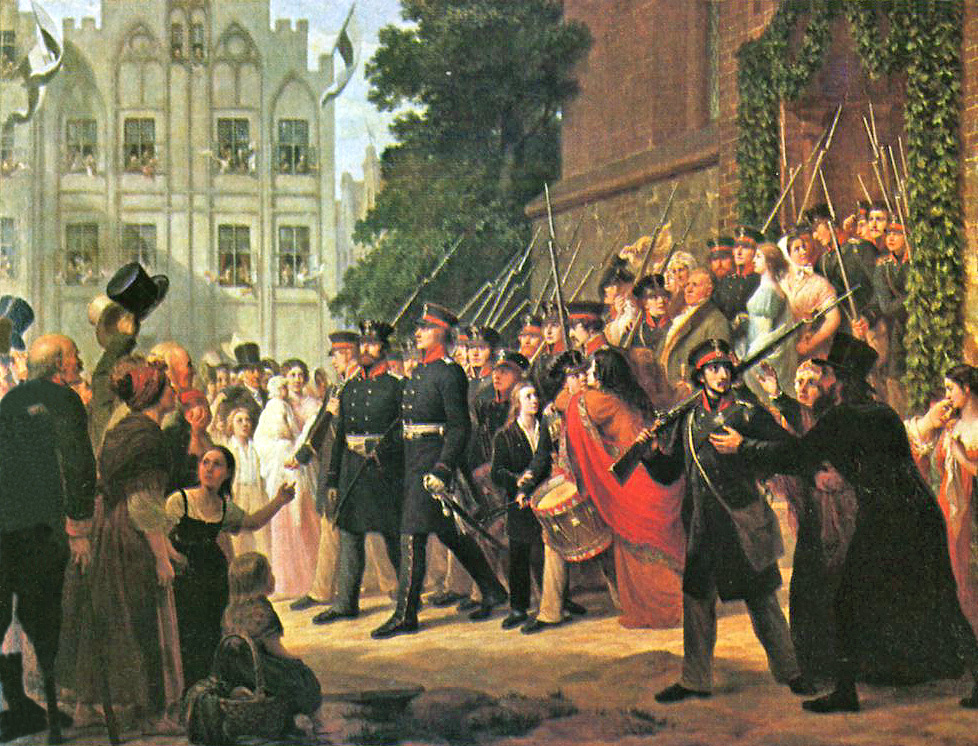
The East Prussian Landwehr, heading out to fight Napoleon's army after their consecration in church (1861)

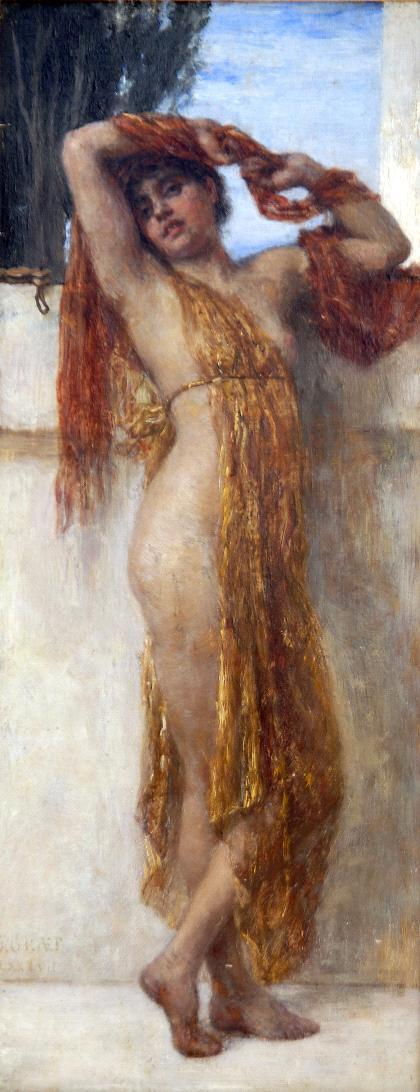
Orientalin (1887)

Gustav Graef (14 December 1821 – 6 January 1895) was a German painter, primarily of portraits and historical subjects.

== Life and work ==
Graef was born in Königsberg. In 1842, he entered the University of Königsberg, where he was an enthusiastic member of the Student Corps and produced his first lithographs. His training as a painter began in Düsseldorf with Theodor Hildebrandt and Wilhelm von Schadow at the Royal Academy. He made several study trips to Antwerp, Paris, Munich and Italy.

Upon his return to Königsberg, he married a former acquaintance from his drawing class, the painter and lithographer Franziska Liebreich (1824–1893), who came from a prominent Jewish family. One of their sons, Botho, became a noted art historian. Their daughter Sabine married the painter Reinhold Lepsius and became a well-known painter herself.

In 1849, he received the contract to paint frescoes in the south dome hall of the Neues Museum; designed by Wilhelm von Kaulbach, depicting Widukind's reconciliation with Charlemagne. This necessitated a move to Berlin and was followed by a commission to paint four scenes from the Labors of Hercules for the Altes Museum. After 1862, he focused on idealized female portraits, which brought him great commercial success. He became a member of the Prussian Academy of the Arts in 1880.

At the peak of his fame, in 1885, he was arrested and charged with the abuse of an underage model. This became a major scandal in Berlin society, as the young woman in question was from a notable family that had been very hospitable to Graef. He was eventually acquitted, but not without great damage to all the parties involved. He died in Berlin, aged 73.
