= Zoe Dana Underhill =

American translator and author

- Born: March 4, 1847; Brook Farm
- Died: December 5, 1934 (aged 87)
- Resting place: Woodlawn Cemetery
- Occupation: Writer, translator
- Children: Ruth Underhill
- Parent(s): Charles Anderson Dana

Zoe Dana Underhill (March 4, 1847 – December 5, 1934) was an American translator and author.

Zoe Dana was born on March 4, 1847 at Brook Farm, Massachusetts. She was the daughter of Charles Anderson Dana, editor of the New York Tribune and the New York Sun, and Eunice McDaniel. In 1872, she married Walter Mitchell Underhill. They had two children, including writer and golfer Ruth Underhill.

Charles Dana was a translator of German and taught German at Brook Farm. Zoe Underhill became a translator herself, compiling and translating a book of fairy tales, The Dwarfs' Tailor. Several of these were translated from German collections of fairy tales by Ludwig Bechstein and Richard von Volkmann.

Underhill also published a number of short stories in magazines. Her story "The Inn of San Jacinto" is collected in Under the Sunset (1906), a volume of stories from Harper's Magazine, and her story "The Conductor's Story" is collected in The Platform Edge: Uncanny Tales of the Railways (2019), published by the British Library.

During the American Civil War, her father served as Assistant Secretary of War. She regularly visited Abraham Lincoln in the White House with her father. When she died in 1934, it was reported that she was thought to be the last living friend of President Lincoln.

== Bibliography ==
- (Trans.) The Dwarfs' Tailor, and Other Fairy Tales. New York: Harper & Bros., 1896.
- (Trans.) Richard [Charles] Lepsius : a Biography; from the German of Georg Ebers. Port. N. York, 1887, 12mo.
