= Botho Graef =

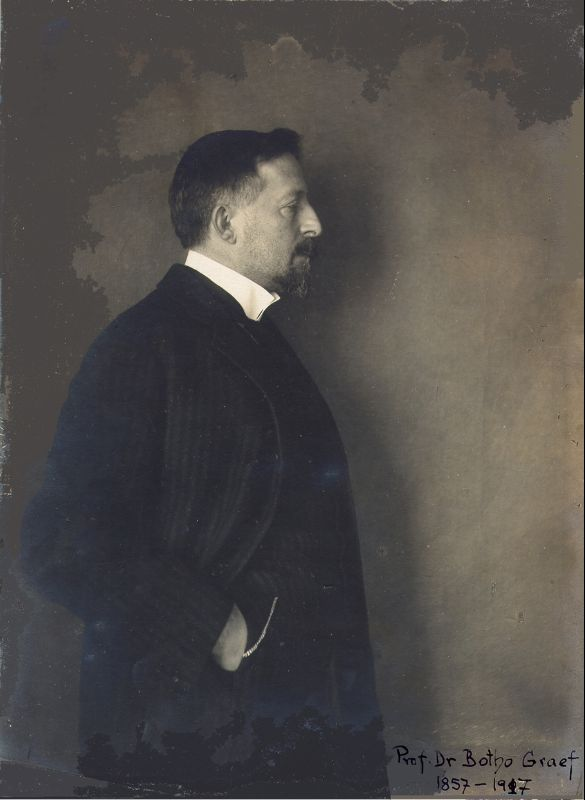
Botho Graef in 1909

Franz Botho Graef (12 October 1857, Berlin – 9 April 1917, Königstein im Taunus) was a German classical archaeologist and art historian. His father was painter Gustav Graef, and his sister, Sabine Lepsius, was also an artist of some note. Graef taught at the University of Jena from 1904 until 1917.

== Writings ==
- Hodlers und Hofmanns Wandbilder in der Universität Jena. Eugen Diederichs Verlag, Jena, 1910.
- Henry van de Velde In: Der Bücherwurm. Monatsschrift für Bücherfreunde. Verlag der Bücherwurm, Dachau, 1913.
- Written with Ernst Langlotz: Die antiken Vasen von der Akropolis zu Athen, Bd. I-II, de Gruyter, Berlin, 1925-1933 (posthum).
