= Hieronymus Hess =

Swiss painter

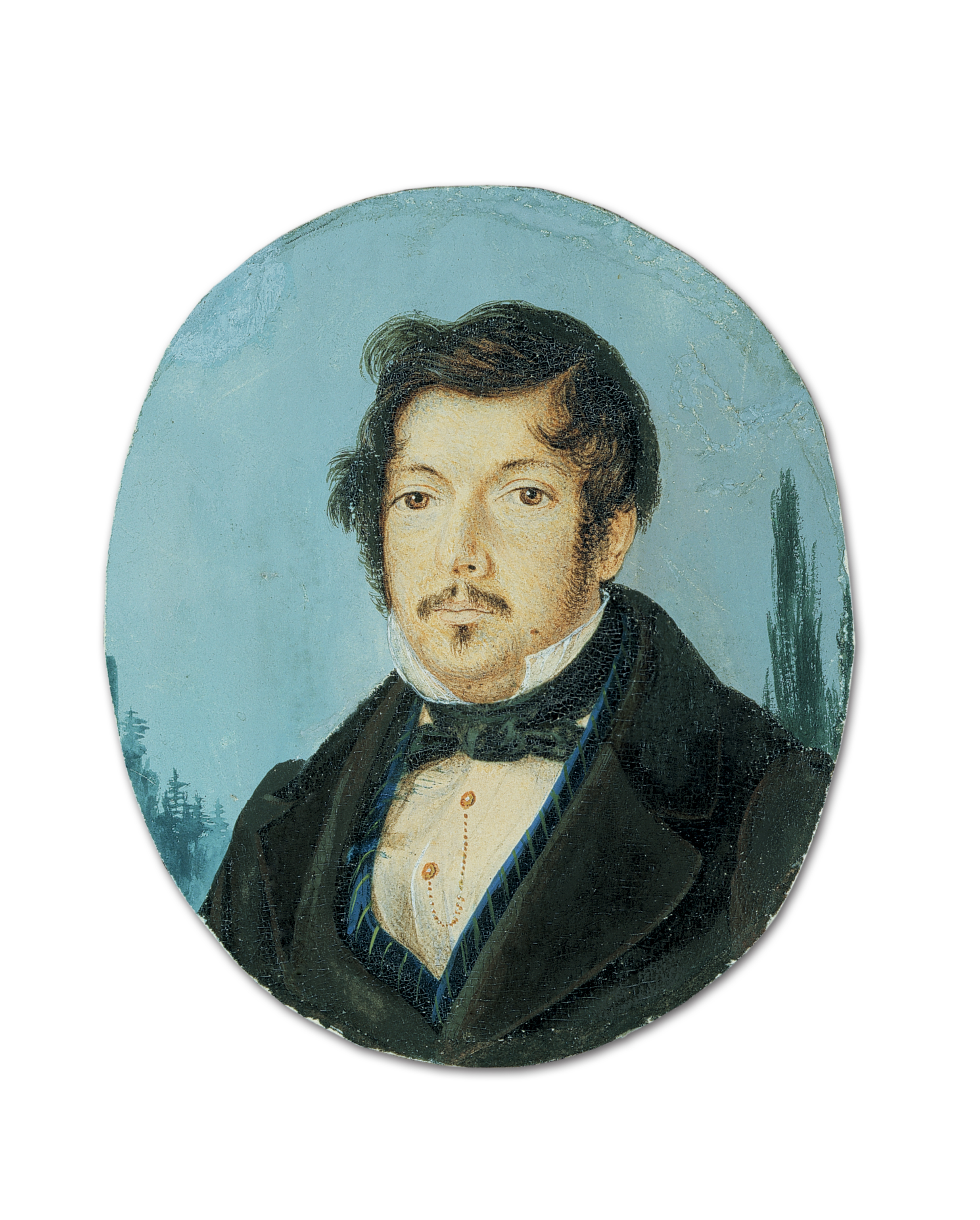
Portrait of Hieronymus Hess

Hieronymus Hess (15 April 1799, Basel – 8 June 1850, Basel) was a Swiss painter and artist from Basel.

== Early life and education ==
Hieronymus was on the 15 April 1799 as the youngest of four sons. His father was Johannes Hess, an immigrant to Basel from Maisprach, and his mother Margaretha Roth. His interest for drawing and painting was soon discovered, but as he grew up in a working-class family and a safe income was more important that art, he began as an apprentice at a house painters workshop. But the as Hess adorned the walls with caricatures he suggested Hess' transfer to the workshop of artist Maximilian Neustück where he collaborated with Neustück and his four sons. Besides he attended the drawing school until 1816. At that time he was influenced by Neustück and also the landscape paintings of Peter Birmann. In 1817 he entered into the services of Birmann, through which he got to know several local artists. He was an often seen visitor of the public art collection in the House zur Mücke whose guardian he often portrayed in his caricatures. In 1819 he undertook a journey to Italy. Having been in Florence and Naples he eventually settled in Rome in 1820. In Rome, where his stay was supported by the Association for the Good and the Charitable (GGG) and the Freemasons from Basel, he further developed his paintings style through the works of the landscape painter Josef Anton Koch and the Danish sculptor Bertel Thorvaldsen. By 1823 he returned to Basel for a year. On recommendation of Thorvaldsen, a 1825 and 1826 he stayed in Nürnberg and worked for a variety of merchants from Zurich. He returned to Basel in 1826 where he entered into the services of the art merchant Johann Rudolf Brenner. He became a teacher at the drawing school between 1831 and 1835, where he taught Ferdinand Schlöth. He died in June 1850.

== Works ==
Himself being a Protestant, religion played a role in several of his paintings. He painted and drew several well known scenes of the Swiss political and cultural life. In his later career he also became a stained glass artist.

== Personal life ==
He married Barbara Schneider from Dörflingen, Schaffhausen, in the year 1828 and did not have any children. His mother died in 1816, his father in 1826.

== Gallery ==
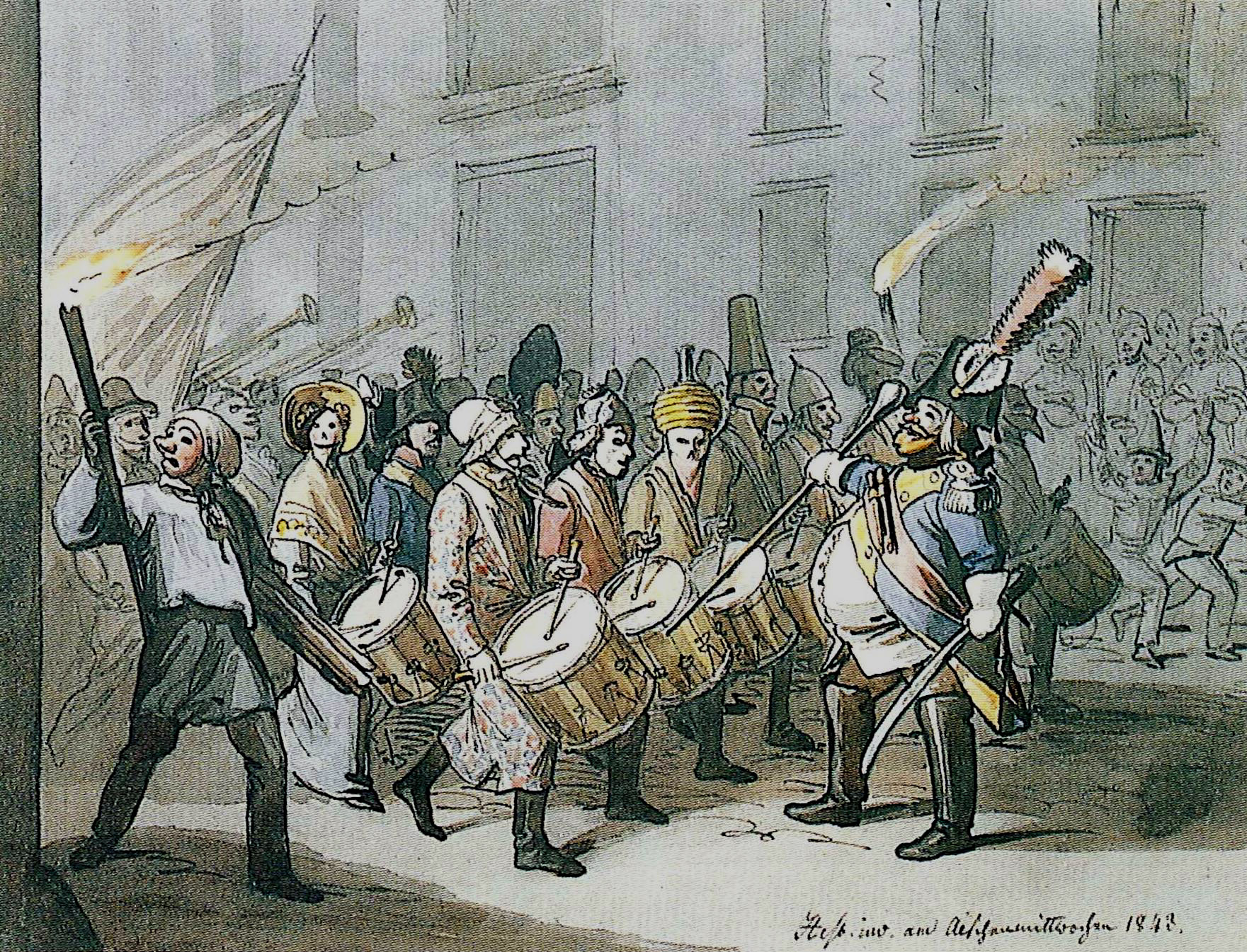
Carnival of Basel

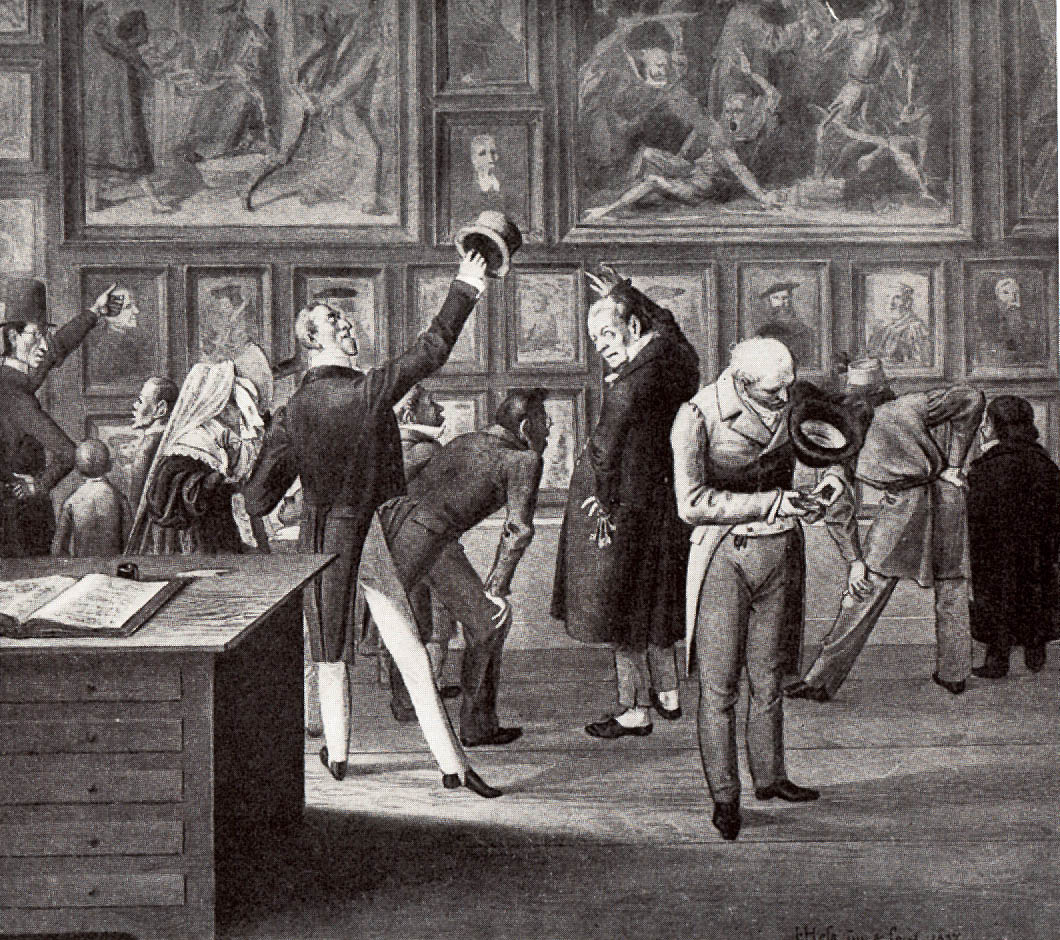
Public Art Collection in Basel
