= Sabine Lepsius =

German painter (1864–1942)

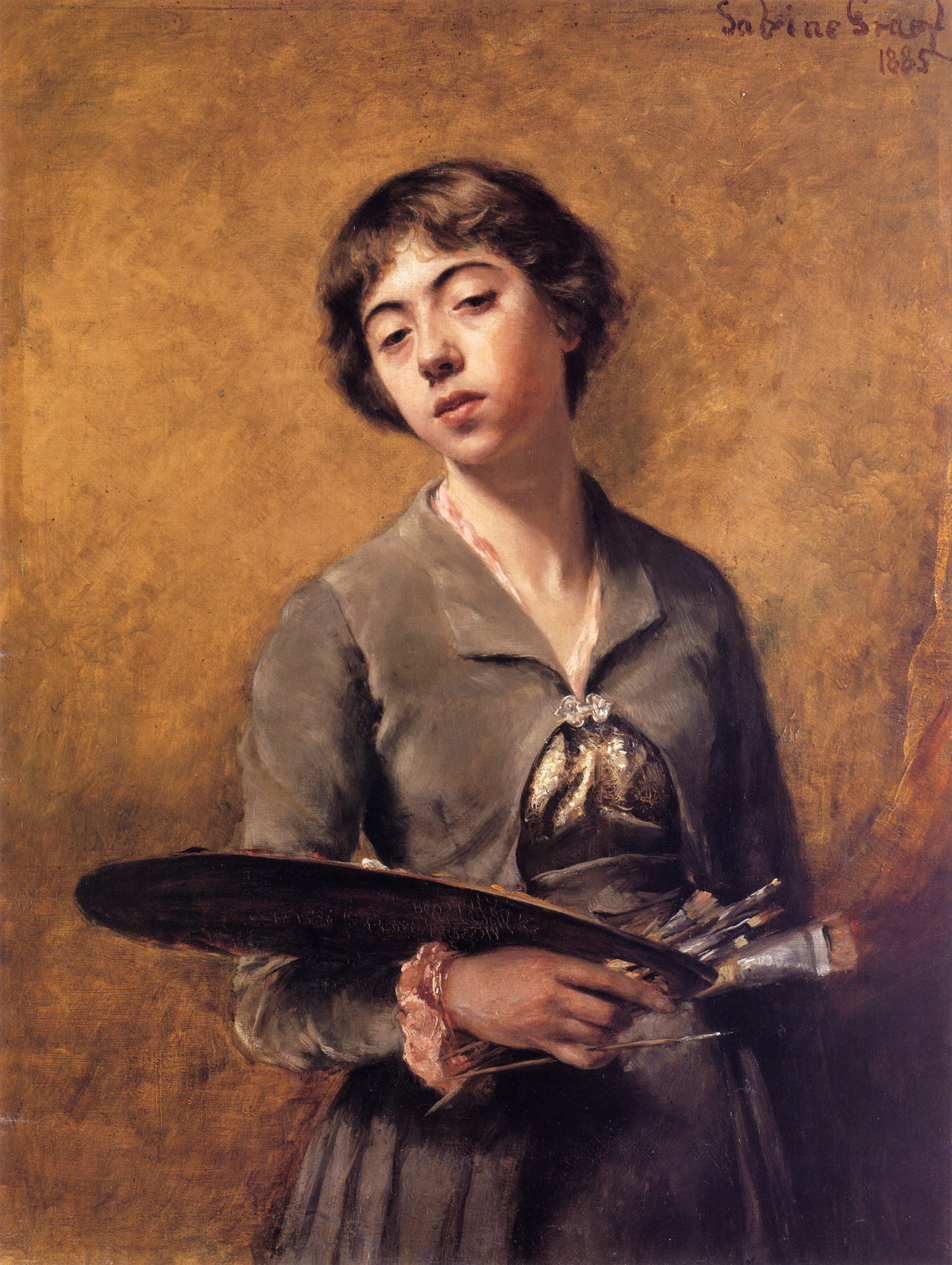
- Self-portrait of Sabine Lepsius in 1885
- Born: Auguste Sabine Graef; January 15, 1864; Berlin, Kingdom of Prussia
- Died: November 22, 1942 (aged 78); Bayreuth, Germany
- Known for: Painting
- Spouse: Reinhold Lepsius

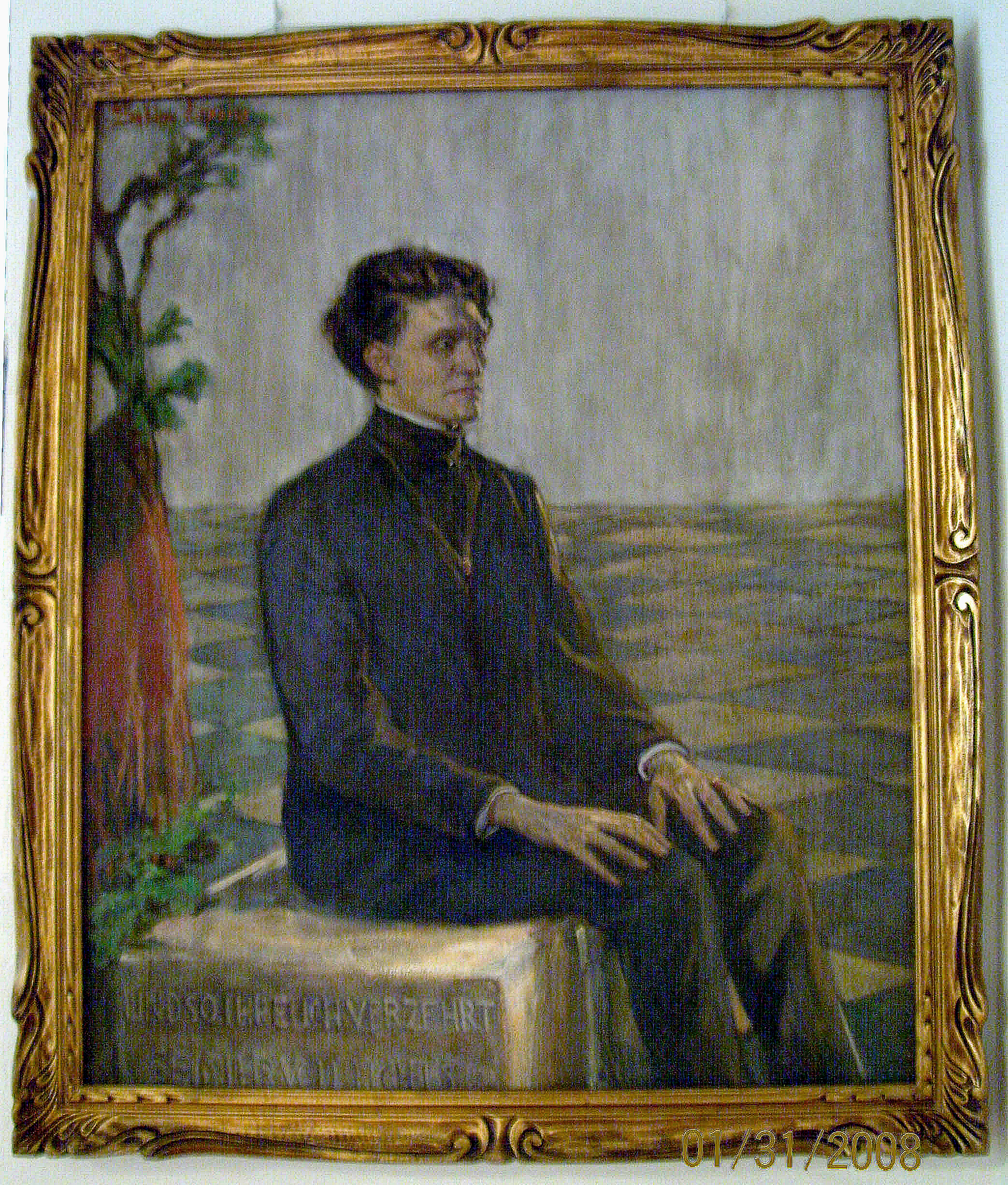
Portrait of Stefan George at the Stefan George Museum in Bingen am Rhein

Sabine Lepsius (15 January 1864 – 22 November 1942) was a German portrait painter.

== Life ==
She was born in Berlin as the daughter of portrait painter Gustav Graef and Franziska Liebreich (1824–1893), a lithographer. She studied with her father and, in 1892, married the painter Reinhold Lepsius. She and her husband were held in equal regard and were very popular with the business community and the wealthy. Her brother was the art historian Botho Graef.

She was also a close friend and follower of Stefan George. Her son Stefan (1897–1917), who was killed in World War I, was named after him. In 1935 she published a book about their friendship in which she attributed her brother Botho's fatal heart attack to the news of her son's death.

Lepsius exhibited her work at the Woman's Building at the 1893 World's Columbian Exposition in Chicago, Illinois.

Her salon in Berlin-Westend was considered a major social gathering point. Georg Simmel, Wilhelm Dilthey, August Endell and Rainer Maria Rilke were among those who attended. She was one of the founding members of the Berlin Secession and exhibited with them until 1913.

Most of her approximately 280 portraits were of people in the Jewish community and were lost or destroyed during World War II.

Lepsius died in 1942 in Bayreuth.

== Writings ==
- Vom deutschen Lebensstil; Leipzig: Seemann & Co. 1916
- Stefan George : Geschichte einer Freundschaft. Berlin: Verlag Die Runde 1935
- Ein Berliner Künstlerleben um die Jahrhundertwende :Erinnerungen; Munich: G. Müller 1972

== See also ==
- List of German women artists
