= Reinhold Lepsius =

German painter

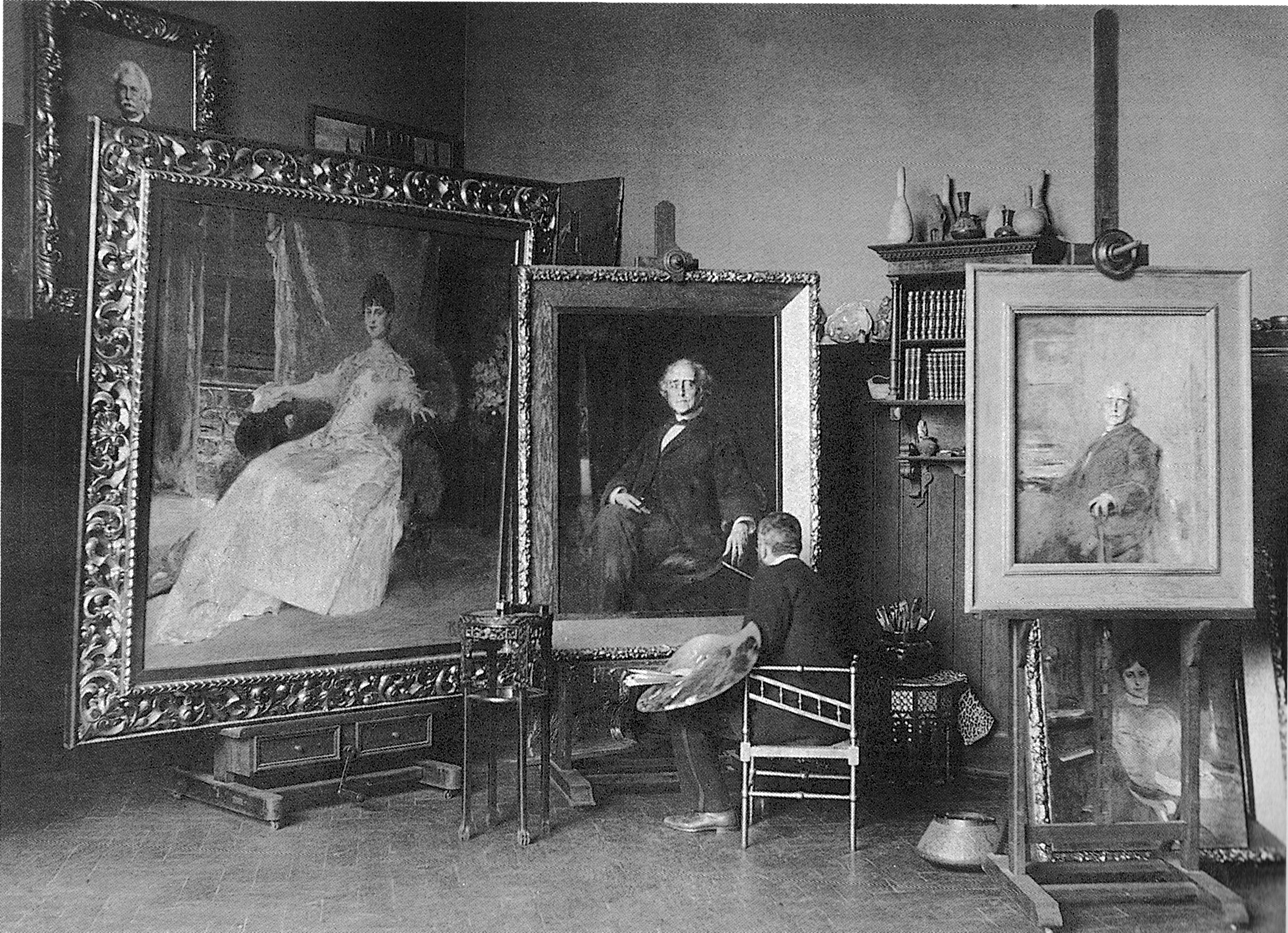
Reinhold Lepsius in his Munich studio, 1892

Reinhold Lepsius (14 June 1857 – 16 March 1922) was a German painter, especially of portraits, and graphic artist.

== Biography ==
He was born in Berlin, the son of Karl Richard Lepsius (1810–1884), professor at the Frederick William University and founder of the Egyptian Museum, and his wife Elisabeth Klein (1828–1899), daughter of the composer Bernhard Klein and great-granddaughter of Friedrich Nicolai. His younger brother Johannes Lepsius became a Protestant theologian, humanist and orientalist.

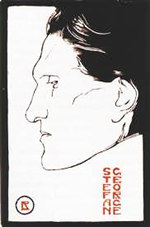
Portrait of Stefan George, woodcut (about 1900)

Reinhold Lepsius was stylistically affiliated with the Berlin Secession school and to some degree with German Impressionism. He was one of the first portraitists to paint after photographs. Lepsius became known for his portraits of the archaeologist Ernst Curtius, the philosopher Wilhelm Dilthey, and the poet Stefan George who organized literary soirées at his house in Westend. He was elected a member of the Prussian Academy of Arts in 1916 and also joined the Deutscher Künstlerbund (Association of German Artists).

He was married to the painter Sabine Lepsius, née Graef (1864–1942), sister of the art historian Botho Graef. The couple had a son, Stefan, born in 1897 and named after Stefan George. He was killed in World War I in early April 1917. Lepsius died in Berlin five years later, aged 64. Numerous of his portraits commissioned by Jewish clients have come to be regarded as lost after Nazi looting.

== Literature ==
- Annette Dorgerloh: Das Künstlerehepaar Lepsius. Zur Berliner Porträtmalerei um 1900, Akademie Verlag, Berlin 2003 (ISBN 3-05-003722-9)
- Sabine Lepsius: Stefan George. Geschichte einer Freundschaft. Verlag Die Runde, Berlin 1935.
