= Karl Richard Lepsius =

German Egyptologist and linguist (1810–1884)

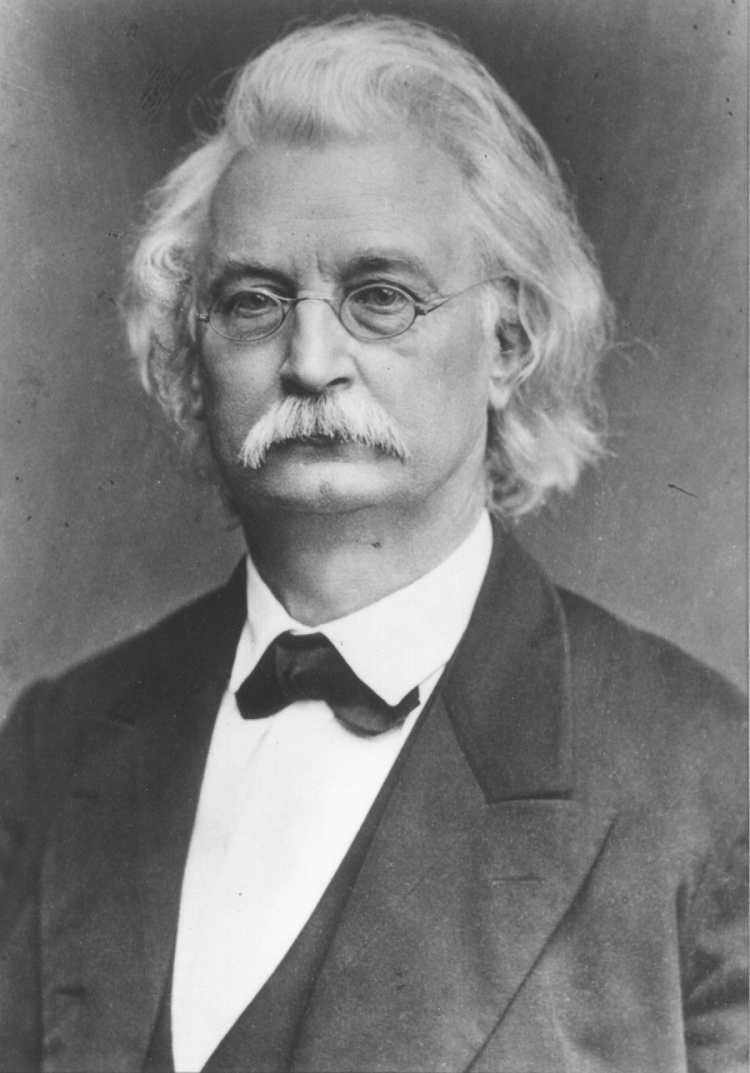
- Lepsius in 1874
- Born: 23 December 1810; Naumburg an der Saale, Kingdom of Saxony
- Died: 10 July 1884 (aged 73); Berlin, Brandenburg, German Empire
- Education: Leipzig University, University of Göttingen, University of Berlin
- Known for: Denkmäler aus Ägypten und Äthiopien
- Spouse: Elisabeth Klein (m. 1846)
- Children: 6
- Relatives: Bernhard Klein (father-in-law)
- Awards: Order of the Red Eagle; Bavarian Maximilian Order for Science and Art; Pour le Mérite; Royal Gold Medal
- Scientific career
- Fields: Egyptology
- Workplaces: University of Berlin

Signature
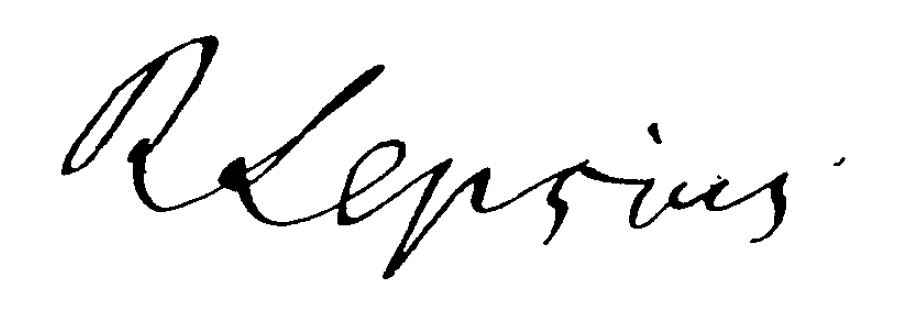

Karl Richard Lepsius (Latin: Carolus Richardius Lepsius; 23 December 1810 – 10 July 1884) was a German Egyptologist, linguist and modern archaeologist.

He is widely known for his opus magnum Denkmäler aus Ägypten und Äthiopien (Monuments from Egypt and Ethiopia), one of the first scientific studies of the pyramids in Giza, Abusir, Saqqara, and Dahshur. His contributions to Egyptology as director of the German Archaeological Instititute and editor of the Zeitschrift für ägyptische Sprache und Altertumskunde have had a lasting impact on the field.

== Early life ==
Karl Richard Lepsius was the son of Carl Peter Lepsius, a classical scholar from Naumburg, and his wife Friederike (née Gläser), who was the daughter of composer Carl Ludwig Traugott Gläser. The family name was originally "Leps" and had been Latinized to "Lepsius" by Karl's paternal great-grandfather Peter Christoph Lepsius. He was born in Naumburg on the Saale, Saxony.

He studied Greek and Roman archaeology at the University of Leipzig (1829–1830), the University of Göttingen (1830–1832), and the Frederick William University of Berlin (1832–1833). After receiving his doctorate following his dissertation De tabulis Eugubinis in 1833, he travelled to Paris, where he attended lectures by the French classicist Jean Letronne, an early disciple of Jean-François Champollion and his work on the decipherment of the Egyptian language, visited Egyptian collections all over Europe and studied lithography and engraving.

== Work ==
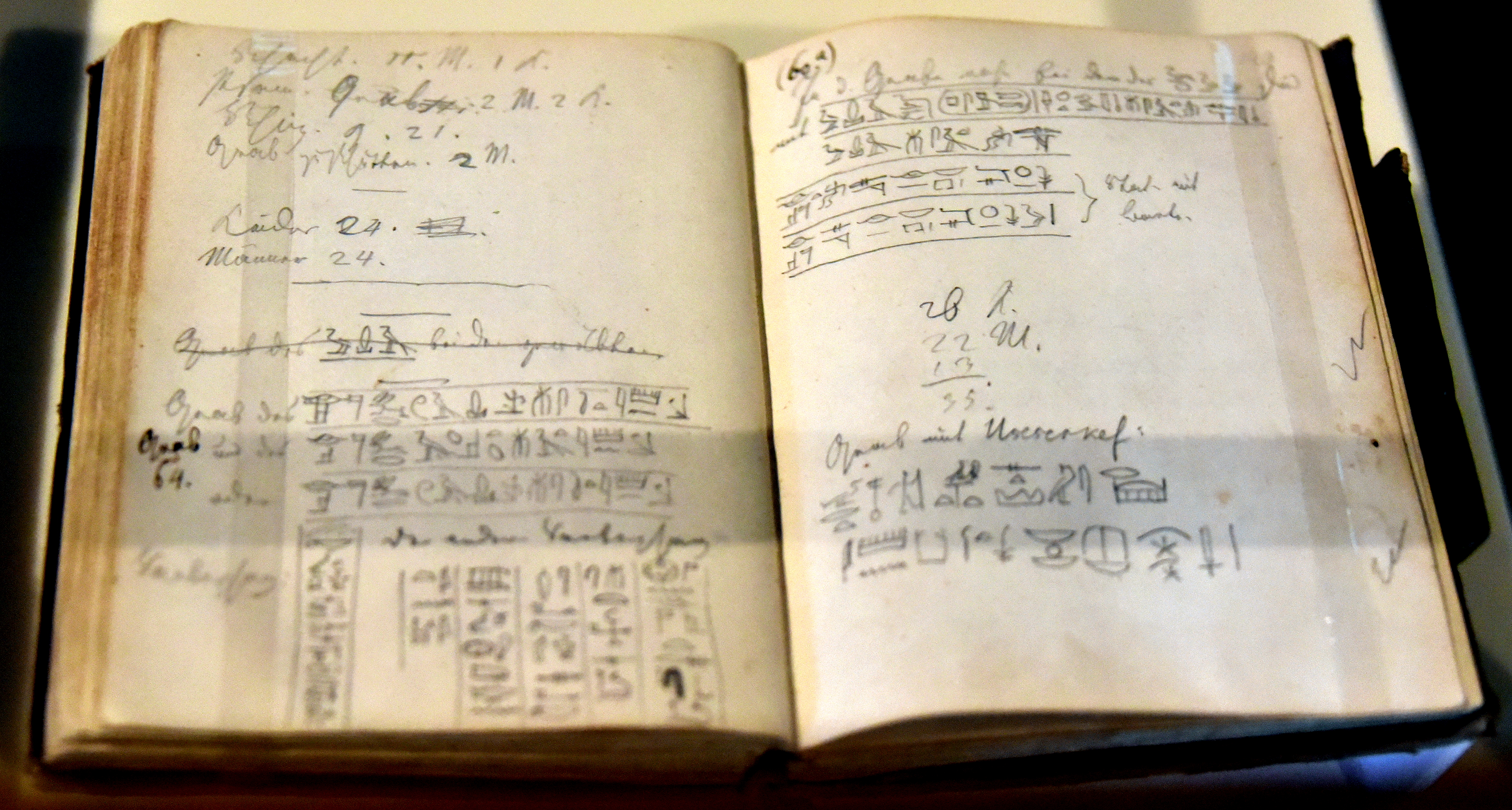
Notebook of Karl Richard Lepsius for the Prussian Expedition in Egypt, 1842–1845. Neues Museum, Berlin

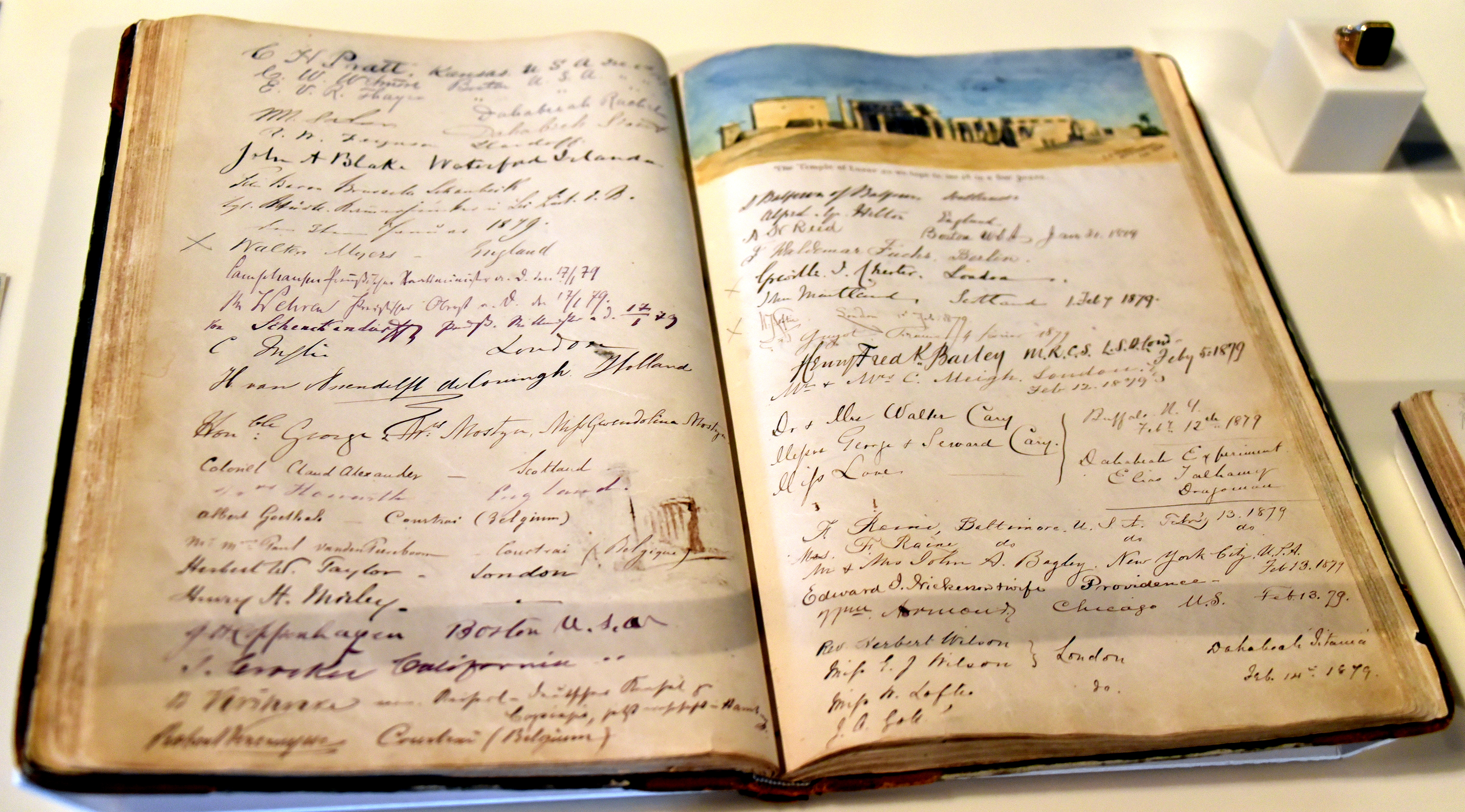
Guest book of Karl Richard Lepsius set up in his days in Western Thebes in 1844. Neues Museum, Berlin

After the death of Champollion, Lepsius made a systematic study of the French scholar's Grammaire égyptienne, which had been published posthumously in 1836 but had yet to be widely accepted. In that year, Lepsius travelled to Tuscany to meet with Ippolito Rosellini, who had led a joint expedition to Egypt with Champollion in 1828–1829. In a series of letters to Rosellini, Lepsius expanded on Champollion's explanation of the use of phonetic signs in hieroglyphic writing, emphasizing (contra Champollion) that vowels were not written.

=== Denkmäler ===
In 1842, Lepsius was commissioned (at the recommendation of the minister of instruction, Johann Eichhorn, and the scientists Alexander von Humboldt and Christian Charles Josias Bunsen) by King Frederich Wilhelm IV of Prussia to lead an expedition to Egypt and the Sudan to explore and record the remains of the ancient Egyptian civilization. The Prussian expedition was modelled after the earlier Napoleonic mission, with surveyors, draftsmen, and other specialists. The mission reached Giza in November 1842 and spent six months making some of the first scientific studies of the pyramids of Giza, Abusir, Saqqara, and Dahshur. They discovered 67 pyramids recorded in the pioneering Lepsius list of pyramids and more than 130 tombs of noblemen in the area. While at the Great Pyramid of Giza, Lepsius inscribed a graffito written in Egyptian hieroglyphs that honours Friedrich Wilhelm IV above the pyramid's original entrance; it is still visible.

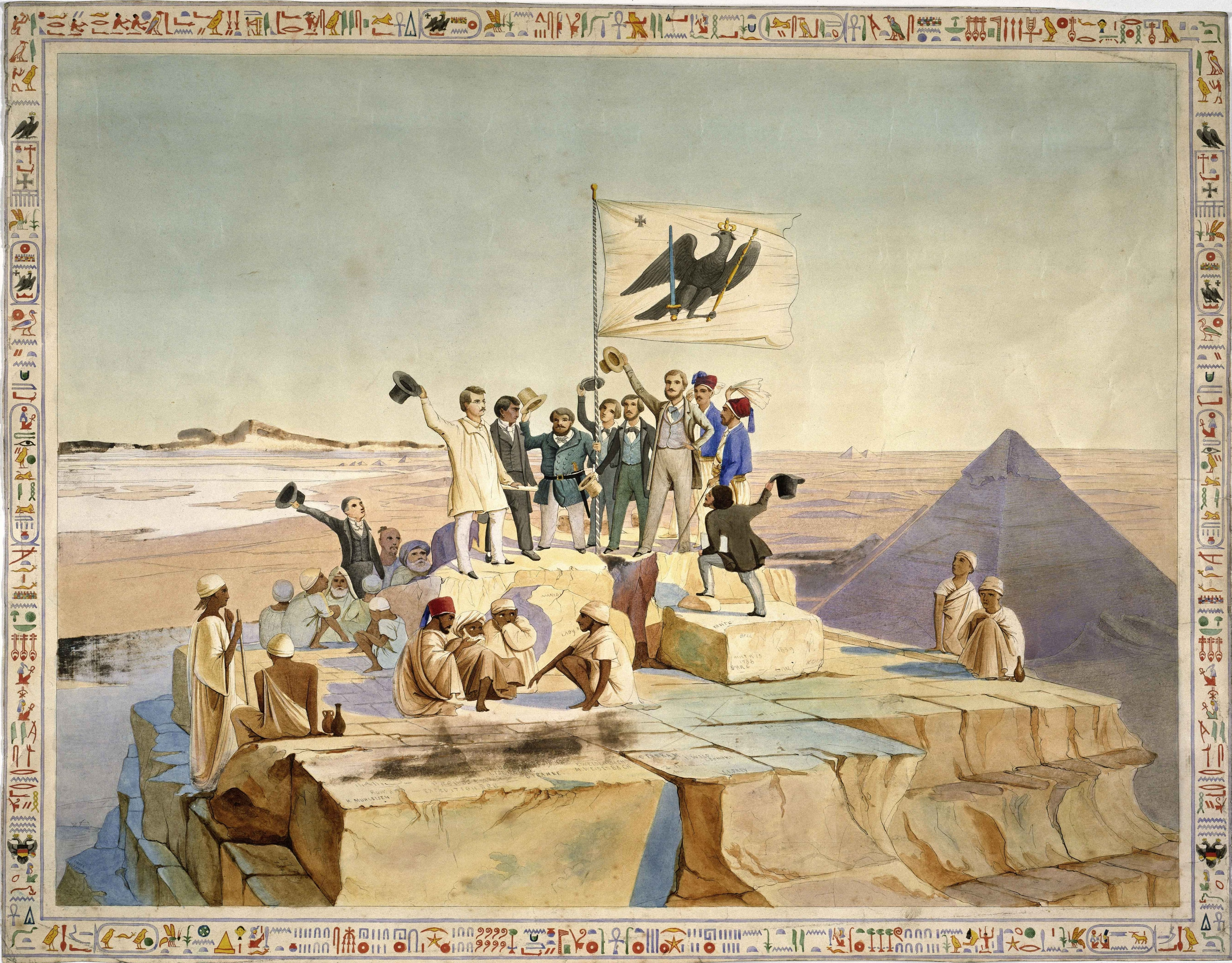
Members of the Prussian expedition to Egypt celebrate Frederick William IV's birthday on the summit of the Great Pyramid of Giza

Working south, stopping for extended periods at important Middle Egyptian sites, such as Beni Hasan and Dayr al-Barsha. In 1843, he visited sites in Nubia such as Jebel Barkal, Meroë and Naqa, ruined ancient cities of the Kushitic Kingdom of Meroë, and copied some of the inscriptions and representations of the temples and pyramids there.

Lepsius reached as far south as Khartoum, and then travelled up the Blue Nile to the region about Sennar, where he met members of the former Sudanese royal family, such as Nasra bint 'Adlan. After exploring various sites in Upper and Lower Nubia, the expedition worked back north, reaching Thebes on November 2, 1844, where they spent four months studying the western bank of the Nile (such as the Ramesseum, Medinet Habu, the Valley of the Kings, etc.) and another three on the east bank at the temples of Karnak and Luxor, attempting to record as much as possible. Afterwards they stopped at Coptos, the Sinai, and sites in the Egyptian Delta, such as Tanis, before returning to Europe in 1846.

In 1845, he was elected as a member to the American Philosophical Society.

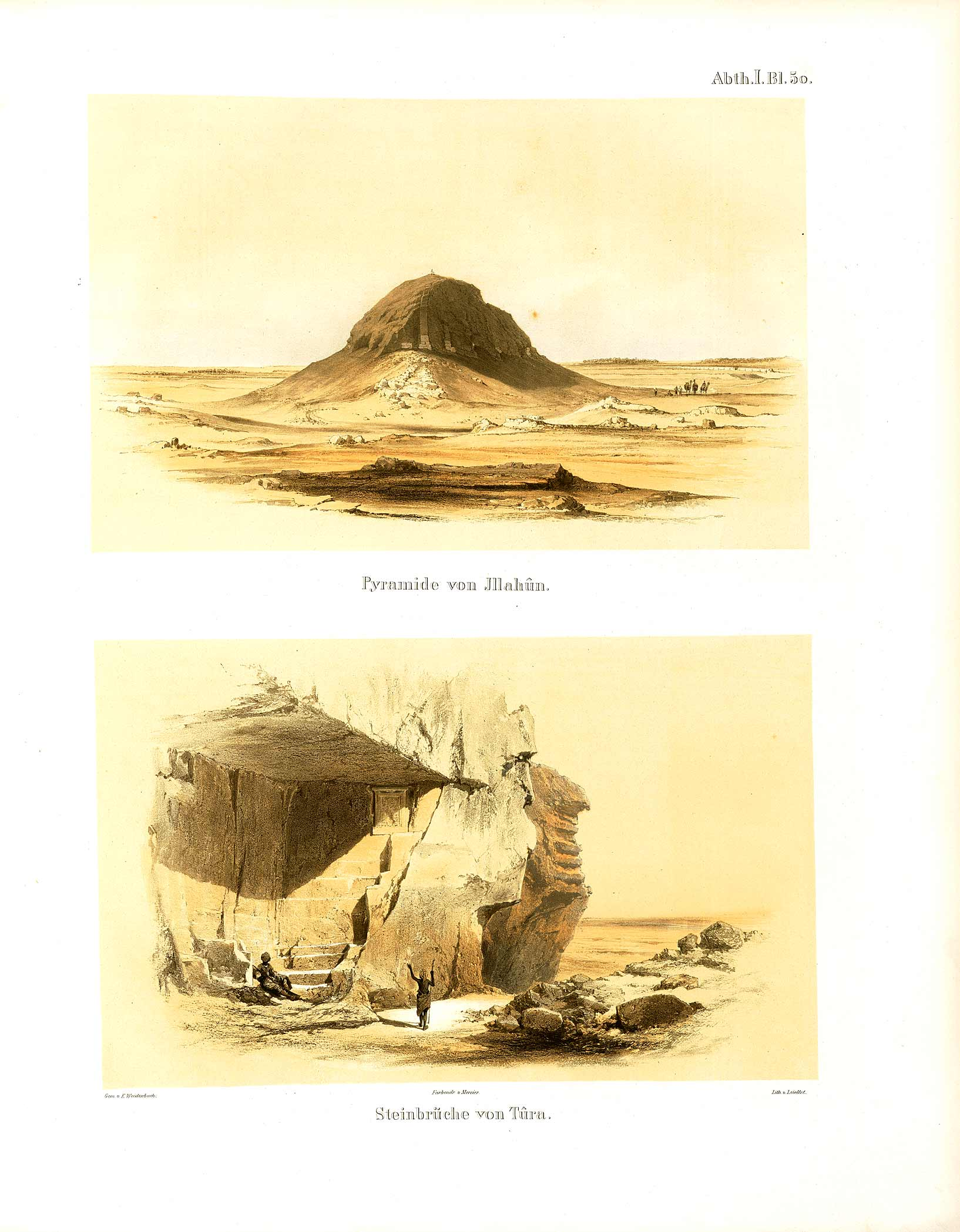
Plates of El-Lahun and Tura from Denkmäler aus Aegypten und Aethiopien

The chief result of this expedition was the publication of Denkmäler aus Aegypten und Aethiopien (Monuments from Egypt and Ethiopia), a massive twelve volume compendium of nearly 900 plates of ancient Egyptian inscriptions, monuments and landscapes, as well as accompanying commentary and descriptions. These plans, maps, and drawings of temple and tomb walls remained the chief source of information for Western scholars well into the 20th century, and are useful even today as they are often the sole record of monuments that have since been destroyed or reburied. For example, he described a "Headless Pyramid" that was subsequently lost until May 2008, when a team led by Zahi Hawass removed a 25-foot-high sand dune to re-discover the superstructure (base) of a pyramid believed to belong to King Menkauhor.

=== Later career ===
Upon his return to Europe in 1845, he married Elisabeth Klein in 1846 and was appointed as a professor of Egyptology at Berlin University in the same year, and the co-director of the Ägyptisches Museum in 1855; after the death of Giuseppe Passalacqua in 1865, he was director of the museum. In 1866, Lepsius returned to Egypt, where he discovered the Decree of Canopus at Tanis, an inscription closely related to the Rosetta Stone, which was likewise written in Egyptian (hieroglyphic and demotic) and Greek.

Lepsius was president of the German Archaeological Institute in Rome from 1867 to 1880, and from 1873 until his death in 1884, the head of the Royal Library at Berlin. He was the editor of the Zeitschrift für ägyptische Sprache und Altertumskunde, a fundamental scientific journal for the new field of Egyptology, which remains in print to this day. While at the editorial helm, Lepsius commissioned typographer Ferdinand Theinhardt (on behalf of the Prussian Academy of Sciences) to cut the first hieroglyphic typeface, the so-called Theinhardt font, which is in use today.

Lepsius published widely in the field of Egyptology, and is considered the father of this modern scientific discipline, assuming a role that Champollion might have achieved, had he not died so young. Much of his work is fundamental to the field. Indeed, Lepsius even coined the phrase Totenbuch ("Book of the Dead"). He was also a pioneer in the field of African linguistics, though his ideas are now mainly considered to be outdated. Based on his work in the ancient Egyptian language, and his field work in the Sudan, Lepsius developed a Standard Alphabet for transliterating African Languages; it was published 1855 and revised in 1863. His 1880 Nubische Grammatik mit einer Einleitung über die Völker und Sprachen Afrika's contains a sketch of African peoples and a classification of African languages, as well as a grammar of the Nubian languages.

== Family ==
On 5 July 1846, he married Elisabeth Klein (1828–1899), daughter of the composer Bernhard Klein and great-granddaughter of Friedrich Nicolai. They had six children, including the geologist and Rector of the Darmstadt University of Technology G. Richard Lepsius (1851–1915), the chemist and director of the Chemical Factory Griesheim Bernhard Lepsius (1854–1934), the portrait painter and member of the Prussian Academy of Arts (as of 1916) Reinhold Lepsius (1857–1929) and the youngest son Johannes Lepsius (1858–1926), Protestant theologian, humanist and Orientalist.

== Major works ==
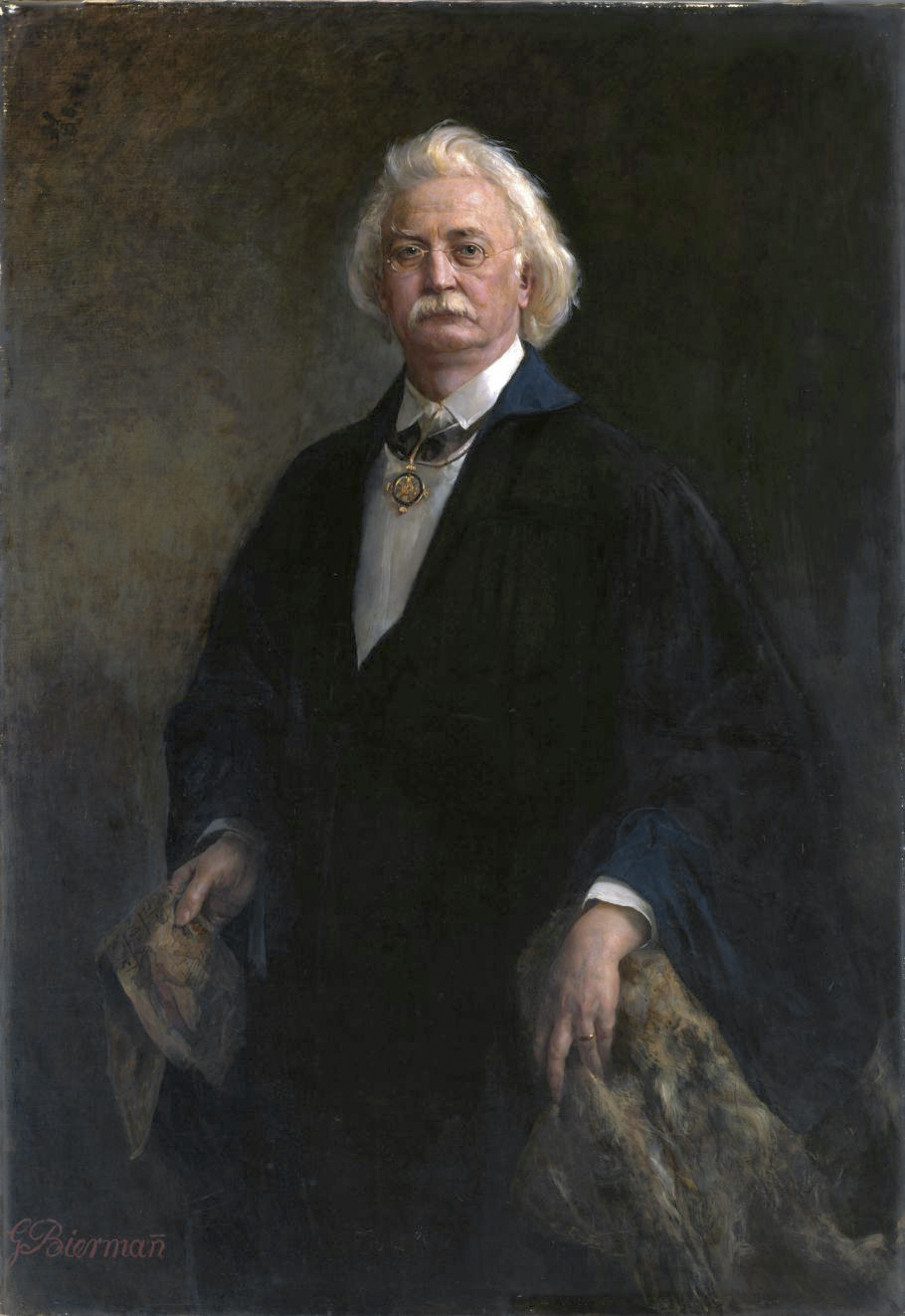
Richard Lepsius (Gottlieb Biermann, c. 1885)

- 1842. Das Todtenbuch der Ägypter nach dem hieroglyphischen Papyrus in Turin mit einem Vorworte zum ersten Male herausgegeben. Leipzig: Georg Wigand. (Reprinted Osnabrück: Otto Zeller Verlag, 1969)
- 1849. Denkmäler aus Ägypten und Äthiopien nach den Zeichnungen der von Seiner Majestät dem Könige von Preußen Friedrich Wilhelm IV. nach diesen Ländern gesendeten und in den Jahren 1842–1845. ausgeführten wissenschaftlichen Expedition auf Befehl Seiner Majestät herausgegeben und erläutert. 13 vols. Berlin: Nicolaische Buchhandlung. (OCLC 1072504946) (Reprinted Genève: Éditions de Belles-Lettres, 1972 - OCLC 857205)
- 1852. Briefe aus Aegypten, Aethiopien und der Halbinsel des Sinai geschrieben in den Jahren 1842–1845 während der auf Befehl Sr. Majestät des Königs Friedrich Wilhelm IV von Preußen ausgeführten wissenschaftlichen Expedition. Berlin: Verlag von Wilhelm Hertz (Bessersche Buchhandlung). Translated into English 1853 Discoveries in Egypt, Ethiopia and the Peninsula of Sinai. London: Richard Bentley. (Reissued by Cambridge University Press, 2010. ISBN 978-1-108-01711-4)
- 1855. Das allgemeine linguistische Alphabet. Grundsätze der Übertragung fremder Schriftsysteme und bisher noch ungeschriebener Sprachen in europäische Buchstaben. Berlin: Verlag von Wilhelm Hertz (Bessersche Buchhandlung)
- 1856. Über die XXII. ägyptische Königsdynastie nebst einigen Bemerkungen zu der XXVI. und andern Dynastieen des neuen Reichs. Berlin: Gedruckt in der Druckerei der königl. Akademie der Wissenschaften Internet Archive. Translated into English 1858: The XXII Egyptian Royal Dynasty, with some remarks on the XXIV and other Dynasties of the New Kingdom. London: John Murray (Republished by Cambridge University Press, 2010. ISBN 978-1-108-01739-8)
- 1860. The Gospel of Mark in the Fiadidja dialect of Nubian also called the Nobiin language. Published in Berlin in 1860. Then edited by Leo Reinisch, and republished by the British and Foreign Bible Society in 1885.
- 1863. Standard Alphabet for Reducing Unwritten Languages and Foreign Graphic Systems to a Uniform Orthography in European Letters, 2nd edition, London/Berlin. (Republished by John Benjamins, 1981. With an introduction by J. Alan Kemp. doi:10.1075/acil.5)
- 1880. Nubische Grammatik mit einer Einleitung über die Völker und Sprachen Afrika's. Berlin: Verlag von Wilhelm Hertz

== Death ==
He had stomach ulcers which became cancerous. After five weeks of undernutrition, he died at 9 am on 10 July 1884.

== See also ==
- Lepsius list of pyramids
- Lepsius Standard Alphabet
- Wilhelm Heinrich Immanuel Bleek

== Sources ==
- Clammer (2005). Sudan. Bradt Travel Guides. ISBN 978-1-84162-114-2.
- Ebers, Georg (1887). Richard Lepsius; a biography. Translated by Underhill, Zoe Dana. New York: William S. Gottsberger.
- Lepsius, Karl Peter (1854). Kleine Schriften: Beiträge zur thüringisch-sächsischen Geschichte und deutschen Kunst- und Alterthumskunde (in German). Vol. 1st Vol. R. Kretschmann. Magdeburg: Albert Schulz.
- Lepsius, Mario Rainer (1993). Demokratie in Deutschland : soziologisch-historische Konstellationsanalysen : ausgewählte Aufsätze. Vol. 100. Göttingen: Vandenhoeck & Ruprecht. ISBN 3-525-35763-X.
- Peck, William H. (2001). "Lepsius, Karl Richard". In Redford, Donald B. (ed.). The Oxford Encyclopedia of Ancient Egypt, Volume 2. Oxford University Press. pp. 289–290. ISBN 978-0-19-510234-5.
